= Przebędowo =

Przebędowo may refer to:

- Przebędowo, Greater Poland Voivodeship (west-central Poland)
- Przebędowo, Pomeranian Voivodeship (north Poland)
- Przebędowo, Warmian-Masurian Voivodeship (north Poland)
- Przebędowo (PKP station)
- Przebędowo Lęborskie (PKP station)
