= Lublewo railway station =

Railway station in Poland

Lublewo

General information
- Location: Lublewo; Poland
- Coordinates: 54.7666°N 17.9459°E
- Owner: Polskie Koleje Państwowe S.A.
- Platforms: None

Construction
- Structure type: Building: Never existed Depot: Never existed Water tower: Never existed

History
- Former names: Lüblow (Pommern) until 1945; Groß Lubow
Location

Lublewo is a non-operational PKP railway station on the disused PKP rail line 230 in Lublewo (Pomeranian Voivodeship), Poland, though the station itself lies more than half a kilometre outside the village proper.

== Lines crossing the station ==
Start station	End station	Line type
Wejherowo	Garczegorze	Closed
