= Zwartówko railway station =

Railway station in Zwartówko, Poland

Zwartówko

General information
- Location: Zwartówko; Poland
- Coordinates: 54°41′15.1″N 17°49′30.4″E
- Owner: Polskie Koleje Państwowe S.A.
- Platforms: None

Construction
- Structure type: Building: No; Depot: No; Water tower: No

History
- Former names: Schwartow until 1945
Location

Zwartówko is a dismantled former PKP railway station on the disused PKP rail line 230 in Zwartówko (Pomeranian Voivodeship), Poland.

== Lines crossing the station ==
Start station	End station	Line type
Wejherowo	Garczegorze	Closed
