= Lubiatowo, Pomeranian Voivodeship =

Lubiatowo
- Village
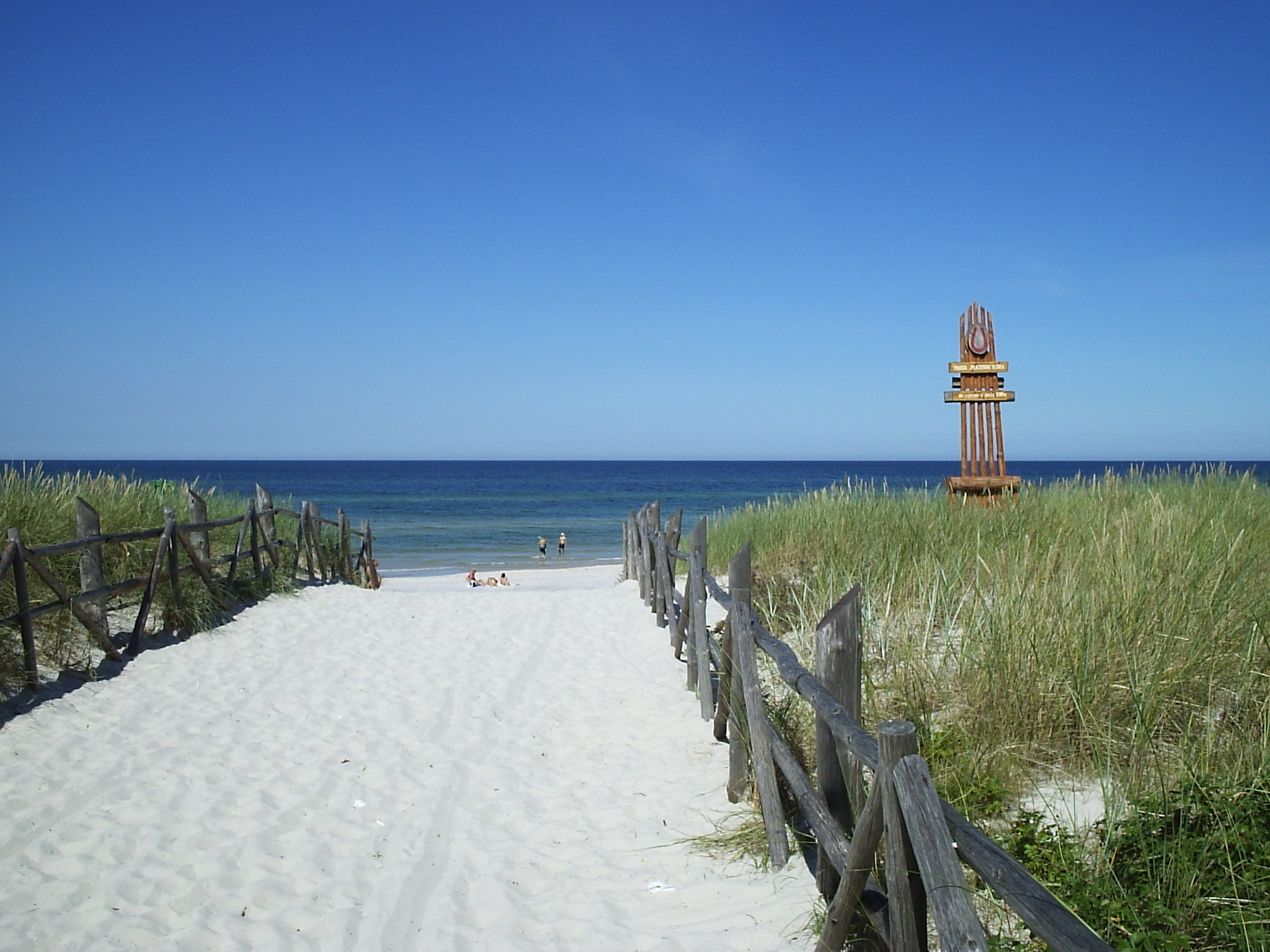
- Beach in Lubiatowo

- Location within Poland
- Coordinates: 54°47′51″N 17°51′43″E
- Country: Poland
- Voivodeship: Pomeranian
- County: Wejherowo
- Gmina: Choczewo
- Population: 130
- Time zone: UTC+1 (CET)
  - Summer (DST): UTC+2 (CEST)
- Vehicle registration: GWE

Lubiatowo [lubjaˈtɔvɔ] is a village in the administrative district of Gmina Choczewo, within Wejherowo County, Pomeranian Voivodeship, in northern Poland. It is a holiday village located on the Polish coast within the historic region of Pomerania.

The settlement Szklana Huta is part of the village.

== Proposed nuclear power station ==
The government of Poland presented Lubiatowo as one, next to Żarnowiec and Gąski, of the possible location of a nuclear power plant in Poland. In Lubiatowo the Citizens' Committee "No to ATOM in Lubiatowo" was formed, which brings together residents of the municipality of Choczewo who do not agree with the location of the nuclear power plant at less than 15 km (9 mi) from residential buildings in Lubiatowo and in the area of protected landscape.

On 22 December 2021, Polskie Elektrownie Jądrowe announced the preferred location for Poland's first commercial nuclear power plant as in Gmina Choczewo, Wejherowo County near the village at a site called Lubiatowo-Kopalino.
