= List of shipwrecks in April 1869 =

The list of shipwrecks in April 1869 includes ships sunk, foundered, grounded, or otherwise lost during April 1869.

== 1 April ==
List of shipwrecks: 1 April 1869
Ship	State	Description
Cambria	United Kingdom	The ship sprang a leak and was beached in Whiting Bay. She was refloated and taken in to Troon, Ayrshire for repairs.
General von Wrangel	Stettin	The brig ran aground on the Longsand, in the North Sea off the coast of Essex, United Kingdom. She was on a voyage from Stettin to Whitehaven, Cumberland, United Kingdom. She was refloated and towed in to Sheerness, Kent, United Kingdom in a waterlogged condition.
Irene	United Kingdom	The brig was driven ashore at Ouistreham, Calvados, France. She was on a voyage from Middlesbrough, Yorkshire to Caen, Calvados.
Isabella Swainson	United Kingdom	The schooner struck a rock at Bowmore, Islay and sank. She was on a voyage from Dublin to Riga, Russia.
Lady Alice Kenlis	United Kingdom	The steamship ran aground at Carlingford, County Louth. She was on a voyage from Newry, County Antrim to Dundrum, County Dublin.

== 2 April ==
List of shipwrecks: 2 April 1869
Ship	State	Description
Foam	United Kingdom	The ship was wrecked at Pernambuco, Brazil. her crew survived.
Stadt Zierikzee	United Kingdom	The barque was abandoned in the Atlantic Ocean. She was on a voyage from Doboy, Queensland to South Shields, County Durham.
Unnamed	United Kingdom	The schooner ran aground on the Burbo Bank, in Liverpool Bay.

== 3 April ==
List of shipwrecks: 3 April 1869
Ship	State	Description
Cardross	United Kingdom	The ship was driven ashore on Spiekeroog, Prussia. She was on a voyage from Hamburg to Queenstown, County Cork. She was refloated.
Ellen	United Kingdom	The schooner was driven ashore on the south coast of the Moray Firth. She was on a voyage from London to Inverness.
Indian Empire	United Kingdom	The ship ran aground and was wrecked on the Muckraputty Lumps, in the Hooghly River. She was on a voyage from Calcutta, India to London.
Suffren	France	The ship was wrecked at Nacqueville, Manche. She was on a voyage from Havre de Grâce, Seine-Inférieure to Cardiff, Glamorgan, United Kingdom and Rio de Janeiro, Brazil. She was refloated on 16 April and taken in to Cherbourg, Seine-Inférieure

== 4 April ==
List of shipwrecks: 4 April 1869
Ship	State	Description
Anne Jane	United Kingdom	The barque sprang a leak and was beached on a sandbank off Rhyl, Denbighshire All twelve people on board were rescued by the Point of Ayr and Rhyl Lifeboats, as was the ship's dog. She was on a voyage from Liverpool, Lancashire to Aberdeen and New York, United States. She was refloated on 8 April and put back to Liverpool.
HMS Rapid	Royal Navy	The Rosario-class sloop ran aground at Malta.

== 5 April ==
List of shipwrecks: 5 April 1869
Ship	State	Description
Hope	United Kingdom	The ship ran aground on the Gunfleet Sand, in the North Sea off the coast of Suffolk. She was on a voyage from Hartlepool, County Durham to London. she was refloated and resumed her voyage.
Limestone	United Kingdom	The sloop foundered in the North Sea off Wells-next-the-Sea, Norfolk. Her crew were rescued. She was on a voyage from King's Lynn, Norfolk to Castleford, Yorkshire.
Nellie Harding	United States	The ship was wrecked near Porthleven, Cornwall, United Kingdom. Her 28 crew were rescued. She was on a voyage from Antwerp, Belgium to Cardiff, Glamorgan, United Kingdom.
Thornley	United Kingdom	The steamship ran aground at Hartlepool, County Durham. She was on a voyage from Hartlepool to London. She was refloated with the assistance of four tugs, including Conqueror (United Kingdom) and resumed her voyage.
Violet	United Kingdom	The schooner ran aground at Dundee, Forfarshire. She was on a voyage from Sunderland, County Durham to Dundee.

== 6 April ==
List of shipwrecks: 6 April 1869
Ship	State	Description
Belinda	United Kingdom	The brig was wrecked on Lundy Island, Devon.
Satisfaction	United Kingdom	The ship was driven ashore and wrecked on Anholt, Denmark. She was on a voyage from Memel, Prussia to Cardiff, Glamorgan. She was refloated on 30 April and towed in to Helsingør, Denmark.
Thames	United States	The steamship caught fire and sank off Cape Hatteras, North Carolina. Five of her crew were reported missing, presumed lost. She was on a voyage from New York to Galveston, Texas.

== 7 April ==
List of shipwrecks: 7 April 1869
Ship	State	Description
Bessie North	United States	The ship was driven ashore at St. Margaret's Bay, Kent, United Kingdom. She was on a voyage from New York to Antwerp, Belgium. She was refloated.
British Lion	United Kingdom	The ship ran aground on the Kish Bank, in the Irish Sea. She was on a voyage from Liverpool, Lancashire to Calcutta, India.
C. A. Jones	United States	The barque was wrecked in Gallop's Bay, on the east coast of Jamaica. Her crew were rescued. She was on a voyage from Kingston, Jamaica to Falmouth, Massachusetts.
Charlotte McDonald	United States	The brigantine was wrecked on the east coast of Jamaica. Her crew were rescued. She was on a voyage from Kingston to Philadelphia, Pennsylvania.
Glengrant	United Kingdom	The schooner was wrecked at Peterhead, Aberdeenshire. Her crew were rescued by a pilot boat. She was on a voyage from Sunderland, County Durham to Buckie, Moray.
Jeanne	France	The ship was driven ashore and wrecked near Cape Wrath, Caithness, United Kingdom.
Manney	United Kingdom	The brig was driven ashore and wrecked at Shakespeare Cliff, Dover, Kent. She was on a voyage from Southampton, Hampshire to Sunderland, County Durham.
Margaret	United Kingdom	The brig ran aground on the Schulhoek, off the Dutch coast. She was on a voyage from Rotterdam, South Holland, Netherlands to Barrow-in-Furness, Lancashire. She was refloated with assistance.
Pinus	Norway	The brig was driven ashore and wrecked 6 nautical miles (11 km) south of the South Stack Lighthouse, Anglesey, United Kingdom. Her nine crew were rescued. She was on a voyage from Bayonne, Basses-Pyrénées, France to Liverpool, Lancashire, United Kingdom.
Ricardo	Flag unknown	The ship sank in the Mediterranean Sea 60 nautical miles (110 km) off Malta with the loss of all but two of her crew. Survivors were rescued by an Italian vessel. She was on a voyage from Odesa, Russia to an English port.
Volante	United Kingdom	The barque was abandoned in the Atlantic Ocean. Her crew were rescued by the barque Lizzie (Norway). Volante was on a voyage from Liverpool to "Welchpool", New Brunswick, Canada and/or Eastport, Maine, United States.

== 8 April ==
List of shipwrecks: 8 April 1869
Ship	State	Description
Anne Whyte	United Kingdom	The ship was driven ashore at Colleville, Seine-Inférieure, France. She was on a voyage from Caen, Calvados to Swansea, Glamorgan.
Diedrich	Bremen	The ship was wrecked near Cap Gris Nez, Pas-de-Calais, France. She was on a voyage from Bordeaux, Gironde, France to Bremen.
Dorset	United Kingdom	The steamship was driven ashore at Kenfig, Glamorgan. She was on a voyage from Port Talbot, Glamorgan to Bridgwater, Somerset. She was refloated the next day and taken in to Porthcawl, Glamorgan.
General Grant	United States	The steamship was destroyed by fire at New Orleans, Louisiana.
Richibucto	United Kingdom	The ship was wrecked on "Fettern". She was on a voyage from Leith, Lothian to Larvik, Norway.
West	Stettin	The ship was destroyed by fire near Swatow, China. She was on a voyage from Hong Kong to Yokohama, Japan.
Unnamed	United States	The ship was wrecked on Inagua, Bahamas. There were nineteen survivors. She was on a voyage from Newport, Rhode Island to New Orleans, Louisiana.

== 9 April ==
List of shipwrecks: 9 April 1869
Ship	State	Description
Aura	United Kingdom	The steamship was wrecked on The Manacles, Cornwall. Her crew were rescued. She was on a voyage from Plymouth, Devon to Waterford.
Lena	United Kingdom	The ship was driven ashore on Capo Blanco, Trinidad. She was on a voyage from Philadelphia, Pennsylvania, United States to Trinidad. She was refloated and taken in to Trinidad.
Marmion	United Kingdom	The ship was wrecked on Inagua, Bahamas. She was on a voyage from Newport, Monmouthshire to New Orleans, Louisiana.
Parker	United Kingdom	The ship was destroyed by fire at Demerara, British Guiana. She was on a voyage from Demerara to Liverpool, Lancashire.

== 10 April ==
List of shipwrecks: 10 April 1869
Ship	State	Description
Clyde	United Kingdom	The steamship was driven ashore at the Shakespeare Cliff, Dover, Kent. She was refloated on 12 April and taken in tow for London.
Heroine	United Kingdom	The brigantine was driven ashore at Littleferry, Sutherland. She was on a voyage from Sunderland, County Durham to Littleferry. She was refloated the next day and taken in to Littleferry in a leaky condition.
J. P. Whitney	United States	The ship foundered in the Indian Ocean. Her crew took to three boats. Two boats, with 21 crew on board were lost. Survivors in the third boat reached the "Six Islands" in twelve days, from where they were rescued some ten weeks later by the brig Ibis (United Kingdom).
Hypatia	United Kingdom	The ship ran aground on the Longsand, in the North Sea off the coast of Essex. She was on a voyage from Sunderland, County Durham to Alexandria, Egypt. She was refloated with assistance.

== 11 April ==
List of shipwrecks: 11 April 1869
Ship	State	Description
Isabella	United Kingdom	The ship was driven ashore at Lisbon, Portugal. She was refloated and taken in to Lisbon, where she was repaired.

== 12 April ==
List of shipwrecks: 12 April 1869
Ship	State	Description
Helen Hardy	United Kingdom	The ship ran aground and was wrecked off Koppalin, Prussia. She was on a voyage from Hartlepool, County Durham to Pillau, Prussia.
Queen of Sheba	United Kingdom	The barque was wrecked on a reef in Green's Bay, Tobago.
William Gunther	United Kingdom	The ship was driven ashore at St. Margaret's Bay, Kent. She was on a voyage from Callao, Peru to Dunkirk, Nord, France.

== 15 April ==
List of shipwrecks: 15 April 1869
Ship	State	Description
Elfrida	Newfoundland Colony	The sealer, a brigantine, was wrecked at Mosquito Point with the loss of seven of her crew.
Fanny	United Kingdom	The polacca was wrecked on the North Tail Sand, off the north Devon coast. Her crew were rescued. She was on a voyage from Bideford, Devon to Swansea, Glamorgan.
Lively	United Kingdom	The schooner struck a sunken wreck off Saltfleet, Lincolnshire and sank. Her crew were rescued. She was on a voyage from Middlesbrough, Yorkshire to Havre de Grâce, Seine-Inférieure, France.
Result	United Kingdom	The ship was driven ashore near Peterhead, Aberdeenshire. She was on a voyage from Iceland to Galway. She had become a wreck by 20 April.
Susannah	United Kingdom	The smack was wrecked at Great Orme Head, Caernarfonshire. Her crew were rescued. She was on a voyage from Bangor, Caernarfonshire to Liverpool, Lancashire.

== 16 April ==
List of shipwrecks: 16 April 1869
Ship	State	Description
Queen	United Kingdom	The schooner ran aground off Dunkirk, Nord, France. She was on a voyage from Middlesbrough, Yorkshire to Dunkirk. She was refloated and taken in to Dunkirk in a leaky condition.
Yo Semite	United States	The ship ran aground off Egremont, Lancashire, United Kingdom. She was on a voyage from San Francisco, California to Liverpool, Lancashire. She was refloated with assistance from the tug Enterprise (United Kingdom).

== 17 April ==
List of shipwrecks: 17 April 1869
Ship	State	Description
Ann	United Kingdom	The Yorkshire Billyboy was wrecked on the Maplin Sand, in the North Sea off the coast of Essex. Her crew were rescued. She was on a voyage from the Humber to London.
Edel	Denmark	The ship departed from Skive for London. No further trace, presumed foundered with the loss of all hands.
J. B. S.	United Kingdom	The ship ran aground on the Black Rock. She was on a voyage from Matanzas, Cuba to Falmouth, Cornwall. She was refloated.
Margaret	Newfoundland Colony	The brig sprang a leak and foundered in the Bristol Channel 12 nautical miles (22 km) off Lundy Island, Devon. Her crew were rescued. She was on a voyage from Penarth, Glamorgan, United Kingdom to Montevideo, Uruguay.
Marina	United Kingdom	The schooner was driven ashore and wrecked at Goodwick, Pembrokeshire. Her crew were rescued. She was on a voyage from Newport, Monmouthshire to Glandore, County Cork.
Pacific	United Kingdom	The steamship was driven ashore at Tønsberg, Norway. She was on a voyage from Hull, Yorkshire to Danzig.
Thyra	Denmark	The barque was abandoned in the Bay of Biscay. She was on a voyage from Swansea, Glamorgan, United Kingdom to Gibraltar.

== 18 April ==
List of shipwrecks: 18 April 1869
Ship	State	Description
Abo	(Russian Empire) Grand Duchy of Finland	The ship departed from Rangoon, Burma for the English Channel. No further trace, presumed foundered with the loss of all hands.
Elizabeth	United Kingdom	The schooner foundered off Dunstanburgh, Northumberland with the loss of three of her five crew. Survivors were rescued by a tug. She was on a voyage from Sunderland, County Durham to Dundee, Forfarshire.

== 19 April ==
List of shipwrecks: 19 April 1869
Ship	State	Description
Atlanta	India	The barque foundered 10 nautical miles (19 km) south by west of Khanderi with the loss of at least seventeen of the 62 people on board. There were at least 33 survivors - nineteen people were rescued by Pattimar (India) and fourteen reached shore in the longboat. Atlanta was on a voyage from Bombay to Bushire, Persia.
Beeston Castle	United Kingdom	The ship was wrecked on the coast of Burma. Her crew survived. She was on a voyage from Bombay, India to Rangoon, Burma.
Isabel	United Kingdom	The schooner ran ashore at Brean, Somerset. She was on a voyage from Arklow, County Wicklow to Cardiff, Glamorgan. She was refloated and towed in to Penarth, Glamorgan.
Nelly	United Kingdom	The sloop foundered in the Irish Sea with the loss of six of the seven people on board. She was on a voyage from Ayr to Belfast, County Antrim.
United Kingdom	United Kingdom	The steamship departed from New York for a British port. No further trace, presumed foundered with the loss of all on board.

== 20 April ==
List of shipwrecks: 20 April 1869
Ship	State	Description
Agamemnon	United Kingdom	The brig was driven at Rhoscolyn, Anglesey. She was on a voyage from Trinidad to Liverpool, Lancashire. She was refloated on 4 May and taken in to Holyhead, Anglesey
General Lee	United Kingdom	The steamship struck the Douro Rock, Lisbon, Portugal. She was on a voyage from the Clyde to Lisbon. She sank the next day.
Imperial	United Kingdom	The ship was wrecked on the Murr Ledges, in the Gulf of St. Lawrence with the loss of all hands. She was on a voyage from Mobile, Alabama, United States to Saint John, New Brunswick, Canada.

== 21 April ==
List of shipwrecks: 21 April 1869
Ship	State	Description
Atlanta	United Kingdom	The ship foundered at Bombay, India with the loss of 31 lives.

== 22 April ==
List of shipwrecks: 22 April 1869
Ship	State	Description
Hurricane	United Kingdom	The ship ran aground and sank at Melbourne, Victoria. All on board were rescued. She was on a voyage from Liverpool, Lancashire to Melbourne.
Imperial	Unknown	During a voyage from Mobile, Alabama, to St. John, New Brunswick, Canada, the full-rigged ship ran aground on St. Mary Ledge — a reef off Grand Manan, New Brunswick — during a storm, broke up, and sank at 44°28.9′N 066°49.9′W with the loss of her entire crew of 22.

== 23 April ==
List of shipwrecks: 23 April 1869
Ship	State	Description
Omar Pacha	United Kingdom	The ship was destroyed by fire. All on board were rescued by the barque Anita Tagliaria (Italy), the brig Maria Rosa (Spain) and the barque Queen of the North (United Kingdom). Omar Pacha was on a voyage from Brisbane, Queensland to London.
Ortensia	United Kingdom	The ship ran aground on the Muckilangbeg Bank, off Tralee, County Kerry. She was on a voyage from Venice, Italy to Tralee. She was refloated and taken in to Tralee in a leaky condition.

== 24 April ==
List of shipwrecks: 24 April 1869
Ship	State	Description
Hilitia	Canada	The ship was wrecked near Mount Desert, Maine, United States.
Theron J. Dale	United States	The schooner was lost at Baracoa, Cuba. Crew saved.
Uselda	United States	The steamship struck a snag and was wrecked in the Missouri River with the loss of 50 lives.

== 26 April ==
List of shipwrecks: 26 April 1869
Ship	State	Description
Isabel	United Kingdom	The ship collided with Dakotah (Flag unknown) and sank at Cardiff, Glamorgan.

== 27 April ==
List of shipwrecks: 27 April 1869
Ship	State	Description
Norge	Norway	The ship was wrecked 15 nautical miles (28 km) from Hammerfest. Her crew were rescued. She was on a voyage from Newcastle upon Tyne, Northumberland, United Kingdom to Hammerfest.

== 28 April ==
List of shipwrecks: 28 April 1869
Ship	State	Description
Bolingbroke	United Kingdom	The ship was wrecked in the Hooghly River. She was on a voyage from Calcutta, India to London.
Friends	United Kingdom	The ship was driven ashore at Lindisfarne, Northumberland. She was on a voyage from Newcastle upon Tyne, Northumberland to Perth.
Glan Mor	United Kingdom	The barque was holed by ice and sank off Grosse-Île, Quebec Canada. Her crew were rescued. She was on a voyage from Llanelly, Glamorgan to Quebec City, Canada. She was condemned.
John Bellamy	United Kingdom	The ship was abandoned off the coast of Burma. Her crew were rescued. She was on a voyage from Calcutta to London.
Pilot	United Kingdom	The steam lighter was driven ashore near Cushendall, County Antrim. Her crew were rescued.
Sussex	United Kingdom	The ship put in to Savannah, Georgia, United States on fire. She was on a voyage from New Orleans, Louisiana to Liverpool, Lancashire. She resumed her voyage on 14 May.

== 29 April ==
List of shipwrecks: 29 April 1869
Ship	State	Description
Belle Creole	United States	The schooner foundered at sea. Her crew were rescued by Walter Smith (United States). Belle Creole was on a voyage from Callao, Peru to Cowes, Isle of Wight, United Kingdom.
Emerald	United Kingdom	The smack was abandoned off the coast of County Cork. She was on a voyage from Blackwater, County Wexford to Cork.
Seal	Belgium	The steamship collided with a barge and ran aground in the River Thames. She was on a voyage from Antwerp to London, United Kingdom. She was refloated and taken in to London.

== 30 April ==
List of shipwrecks: 30 April 1869
Ship	State	Description
Lady Flora	United Kingdom	The ship was driven ashore at Caister-on-Sea, Norfolk. She was on a voyage from London to Hull, Yorkshire.
Lily Green	United Kingdom	The schooner struck the Victoria Rock, on the coast of Anglesey. She was on a voyage from "Llanhairn" to Runcorn, Cheshire. She was refloated and taken in to Cemlyn, Anglesey.
Panope	United Kingdom	The ship ran aground at Hellevoetsluis, Zeeland, Netherlands and sprang a leak. She was on a voyage from Newcastle upon Tyne, Northumberland to Dordrecht, South Holland, Netherlands.
Richmond	United Kingdom	The ferryboat collided with the ferryboat Woodside (United Kingdom) in the River Mersey. All on board were rescued. She was towed to Birkenhead, Cheshire by the tug Lioness (United Kingdom) and sank there.
St. George	United Kingdom	The smack ran aground on the Chicken Rocks, off the Calf of Man, Isle of Man and was abandoned by her crew. She was on a voyage from Killough, County Down to Liverpool, Lancashire. St. George was taken in to Kingstown, County Dublin in a derelict condition on 4 May by the fishing trawler Undine (United Kingdom).

== Unknown date ==
List of shipwrecks: Unknown date in April 1869
Ship	State	Description
America	United States	The steamship was destroyed by fire at San Juan del Sur, Nicaragua before 17 April. She was on a voyage from Panama City, United States of Colombia to San Francisco, California.
August M. Gott	United States	The ship was abandoned in the Atlantic Ocean before 10 April.
Boanerges	United Kingdom	The ship collided with the steamship Moravian (United Kingdom) and was abandoned before 27 April. Her 28 crew were rescued by Moravian. Boanerges was on a voyage from Sunderland, County Durham to Quebec City, Canada.
Bretagne	France	The brigantine collided with the full-rigged ship Explorer(United Kingdom) and sank in the Atlantic Ocean before 28 April with the loss of five of her crew. Survivors were rescued by Explorer. Bretagne was on a voyage from Buenos Aires, Argentina to Bordeaux, Gironde.
Charles Poole	United Kingdom	The ship was wrecked on Inagua, Bahamas before 6 April. She was on a voyage from Cardiff, Glamorgan to Havana, Cuba.
Eleazer	Norway	The steamship was destroyed by fire off the coast of Greenland.
Fleetwing	Norway	The ship collided with Emma (United Kingdom) and sank at Nantes, Loire-Inférieure, France with the loss of thirteen of her crew.
G. A. Thompson	United States	The steamboat struck a submerged object, caught fire and sank in the Arkansas River 40 nautical miles (74 km) downstream of Little Rock, Arkansas with the loss of seventeen lives. Survivors were rescued by Caldwell (United States).
Germania	United States	The ship was wrecked on Inagua, Bahamas. She was on a voyage from New York to Veracruz, Mexico.
Johanna	New Zealand	The schooner departed Timaru for Auckland in early April, and was not seen again.
John B. Russell	New Zealand	The 56-ton schooner departed Lyttelton Harbour for Auckland in early April, and was not seen again.
Martha	United Kingdom	The ship was driven ashore on Guadeloupe before 17 April. She was on a voyage from Newcastle upon Tyne, Northumberland to Guadeloupe.
Principality	United Kingdom	The brig was run down and sunk in the Atlantic Ocean by Dolores (Spain). Her crew were rescued by Dolores. She came ashore in the Bahamas in a capsized condition on 27 April.
Sarah Sands	United Kingdom	The barque was wrecked on the Kalpein Reef, in the Laccadive Islands before 25 April. Her crew were rescued. She was on a voyage from Liverpool, Lancashire to Bombay.
Sculdo	Flag unknown	The ship was lost off the coast of Greenland.
Simmonds	Canada	The ship was wrecked on "Buena Vist Island", in the Saint Lawrence River. Her crew were rescued. She was on a voyage from Liverpool to Quebec City.
Sperwer	Netherlands	The cutter was wrecked on the Wednesday Spit, in the Prince of Wales Islands. Her eight crew were murdered by the local inhabitants.
Teresa P.	Austria-Hungary	The brig was wrecked on the south coast of the Isle of Wight, United Kingdom.
