= Choczewko railway station =

Railway station in Poland

Choczewko

General information
- Location: Choczewko; Poland
- Coordinates: 54.735701°N 17.849684°E
- Owner: Polskie Koleje Państwowe S.A.
- Platforms: None

Construction
- Structure type: Building: No; Depot: No; Water tower: No

History
- Former names: Goten until 1945; Chottschewke
Location

Choczewko is a dismantled former PKP railway station on the disused PKP rail line 230 in Choczewko (Pomeranian Voivodeship), Poland.

== Lines crossing the station ==
Start station	End station	Line type
Wejherowo	Garczegorze	Closed
