= Osieki Lęborskie railway station =

Railway station in Poland

Osieki Lęborskie

General information
- Location: Osieki Lęborskie; Poland
- Coordinates: 54°45′56.8″N 17°54′46.8″E
- Owner: Polskie Koleje Państwowe S.A.
- Platforms: None

Construction
- Structure type: Building: Never existed Depot: Never existed Water tower: Never existed

History
- Former names: Ossecken until 1945
Location

Osieki Lęborskie is a non-operational PKP railway station on the disused PKP rail line 230 in Osieki Lęborskie (Pomeranian Voivodeship), Poland. It lies more than a kilometre outside the village proper on the road between Osieki Lęborskie and Lublewo.

== Lines crossing the station ==
Start station	End station	Line type
Wejherowo	Garczegorze	Closed
