= Gościęcino railway station =

Railway station in Poland

Gościęcino

General information
- Location: Gościęcino; Poland
- Coordinates: 54.672344°N 17.818179°E
- Owner: Polskie Koleje Państwowe S.A.
- Platforms: None

Construction
- Structure type: Building: No; Depot: No; Water tower: No

History
- Former names: Gossentin (Kr. Lauenburg) until 1945
Location

Gościęcino is a non-operational PKP railway station on the disused PKP rail line 230 in Gościęcino (Pomeranian Voivodeship), Poland.

== Lines crossing the station ==
Start station	End station	Line type
Wejherowo	Garczegorze	Closed
