= Zwartowo railway station =

Railway station in Poland

Zwartowo

General information
- Location: Zwartowo; Poland
- Coordinates: 54°41′59.7″N 17°49′14.2″E
- Owner: Polskie Koleje Państwowe S.A.
- Platforms: None

Construction
- Structure type: Building: No; Depot: No; Water tower: No

History
- Former names: Schwartow until 1945
Location

Zwartowo is a non-operational PKP railway station on the disused PKP rail line 230 in Zwartowo (Pomeranian Voivodeship), Poland.

== Lines crossing the station ==
Start station	End station	Line type
Wejherowo	Garczegorze	Closed
