= List of shipwrecks in December 1842 =

The list of shipwrecks in December 1842 includes ships sunk, foundered, wrecked, grounded, or otherwise lost during December 1842.

== 1 December ==
List of shipwrecks: 1 December 1842
| Ship | State | Description |
|---|---|---|
| Brunswick | (United Kingdom of Great Britain and Ireland) British North America | The ship was driven ashore at Eastport, Maine, United States. She was on a voyage from Saint Andrews, New Brunswick to Barbados. She was refloated and put back to New Brunswick. |
| Corinth | United Kingdom | The ship was driven ashore crewless at Lindisfarne, Northumberland. |
| Edward and Samuel | (United Kingdom of Great Britain and Ireland) British North America | The ship was lost near Sydney, Nova Scotia with the loss of all on board. |
| Lyons | United Kingdom | The ship was wrecked on the Hasnas Reef, in the Baltic Sea. Her crew were rescued. She was on a voyage from Vyborg, Grand Duchy of Finland to Hull, Yorkshire. |
| Suffolk | United Kingdom | The ship ran aground on the Hasnas Reef. She was on a voyage from Varberg, Sweden to Hull. She was refloated. |
| Trinidad | United Kingdom | The ship was abandoned in the Atlantic Ocean130 nautical miles (240 km) north of São Miguel Island, Azores. Her crew were rescued by Hawk (United Kingdom)). She was on a voyage from London to British Honduras. |
| William Hanley | United Kingdom | The ship was driven ashore at Dover, Kent. She was on a voyage from Newcastle upon Tyne, Northumberland to Guernsey, Channel Islands. She was refloated and taken into Ramsgate, Kent. |
| William M | United States | The ship was driven ashore at Harbour de Lute, New Brunswick, British North America. |

== 2 December ==
List of shipwrecks: 2 December 1842
| Ship | State | Description |
|---|---|---|
| Apparance | Sweden | The ship was driven ashore at Randers, Norway. She was on a voyage from Christianstad to London, United Kingdom. |
| Don de Dieu | France | The ship was wrecked on the Île d'Oléron, Charente-Maritime. She was on a voyage from Libourne, Gironde to Redon, Ille-et-Vilaine. |
| Eric and Lorenz | France | The ship was wrecked at Karlskrona, Sweden. She was on a voyage from Cette, Hérault to Karlskrona. |
| Finance | United Kingdom | The ship was driven ashore near Randers. Her crew were rescued. She was on a voyage from Saint Petersburg, Russia to London. She was refloated in September 1843 and taken into Frederikshavn, Denmark for repairs. |
| Hoffnung | Stettin | The ship was driven ashore and sank east of Alt Skagen. Her crew were rescued. She was on a voyage from London to Stettin. |
| Johanna Frederica | Sweden | The ship was wrecked off Amrum, Duchy of Schleswig. Her crew were rescued. She was ohn a voyage from Agrigento, Sicily to Hamburg. |
| Lion | United Kingdom | The ship was driven ashore and wrecked east of Christiansand, Norway. Her crew were rescued. She was on a voyage from Vyborg, Grand Duchy of Finland to Hull, Yorkshire. |
| Neptune | United Kingdom | The ship ran aground on the Middle Sand, in the North Sea off the coast of Essex. She was on a voyage from London to Bordeaux, Gironde, France. Neptune was refloated and taken into Whitstable, Kent. |
| Tenance | United Kingdom | The ship was driven ashore near Randers. Her crew were rescued. She was on a voyage from Saint Petersburg to London. |
| Voluna | United Kingdom | The ship was wrecked off "Baraqua Point". She was on a voyage from Calcutta, India to Moulmein, Burma. |

== 3 December ==
List of shipwrecks: 3 December 1842
| Ship | State | Description |
|---|---|---|
| Atlas den Andra | Spain | The ship was driven ashore and damaged on the coast of Finland. She was on a voyage from Cádiz to Vyborg, Grand Duchy of Finland. She was refloated |
| Commerce | United Kingdom | The ship was driven ashore at Inverkeithing, Fife. She was on a voyage from St. Margaret's Hope, Orkney Islands to Leith, Lothian. |
| Julie | Russia | The ship was wrecked on Anholt, Denmark. Her crew were rescued by the steamship Prindsesse Wilhelmine (Denmark). She was on a voyage from Liepāja to Hull, Yorkshire, United Kingdom. |
| Ruth | United Kingdom | The barque ran aground at Cork. She was on a voyage from Cork to Liverpool, Lancashire. She was refloated the next day and resumed her voyage. |

== 4 December ==
List of shipwrecks: 4 December 1842
| Ship | State | Description |
|---|---|---|
| Anne | United Kingdom | The ship was driven ashore at Flamborough Head, Yorkshire. She was refloated and resumed her voyage. |
| Caroline Emilie | Stettin | The ship was wrecked on Anholt, Denmark. Her crew were rescued. She was on voyage from Newcastle upon Tyne, Northumberland, United Kingdom to Stettin. |
| David Owen | United Kingdom | The brig was driven ashore at Flamborough Head. She was refloated. |
| Helen | United Kingdom | The schooner was wrecked at "Girinish", South Uist, Outer Hebrides. Her crew were rescued. She was on a voyage from the Clyde to Limerick. |
| Jeune Virginie | France | The ship was driven ashore and wrecked at Bizerte, Beylik of Tunis. Her crew were rescued. She was on a voyage from Marseille, Bouches-du-Rhône to Bône, Algeria |
| Lively | (United Kingdom of Great Britain and Ireland) British North America | The ship was driven ashore at Dartmouth, Nova Scotia. |
| Maria Darlington | United Kingdom | The ship foundered in the North Sea off Filey, Yorkshire. Her crew were rescued. She was on a voyage from Middlesbrough, Yorkshire to Colchester, Essex. |
| Mathilde | Danzig | The ship was wrecked in the Jeune Bight. Her crew were rescued. She was on a voyage from Jersey, Channel Islands to Danzig. She was refloated on 14 December and taken into "Svanike". |
| Packet | (United Kingdom of Great Britain and Ireland) British North America | The ship was driven ashore at Halifax, Nova Scotia. She was o a voyage from Antigonish, Nova Scotia to Halifax. |
| Sally | United Kingdom | The ship was driven ashore at Little Harbour, Halifax, Nova Scotia. |
| William | (United Kingdom of Great Britain and Ireland) British North America | The ship was driven ashore at Halifax. |

== 5 December ==
List of shipwrecks: 5 December 1842
| Ship | State | Description |
|---|---|---|
| Antwerpen | Belgium | The steamship ran aground 1½ leagues (4.5 nautical miles (8.3 km)) west of Blankenberge, West Flanders. She was on a voyage from London, United Kingdom to Antwerp, West Flanders. She was later refloated with the assistance of a fishing boat and resumed her voyage. |
| Hoffnungs | Prussia | The ship was driven ashore near Stolpmünde. Her crew were rescued. She was on a voyage from Memel to Porto, Portugal. |
| Le Libere | France | The galiot caught fire and sank at Algiers, Algeria. |
| Singular | Spain | The brig was wrecked on the Prata Shoal, in the South China Sea. All on board survived. She was on a voyage from Manila, Spanish East Indies to Macao. |
| Water Witch | (United Kingdom of Great Britain and Ireland) South Australia | The cutter sank in the Murray River at Moorundie, South Australia. |
| Windhond | Netherlands | The sloop capsized in the Kattegat. Her crew were rescued by Meg Lee (United Kingdom). |

== 6 December ==
List of shipwrecks: 6 December 1842
| Ship | State | Description |
|---|---|---|
| Angler | United Kingdom | The ship was wrecked on Grand Turk Island. Her crew were rescued. She was on a voyage from Barbados to the Turks Islands. |
| Excellent | United Kingdom | The ship was driven ashore at Nieuwesluis, Zeeland, Netherlands. She was on a voyage from Rio de Janeiro, Brazil to Rotterdam, South Holland, Netherlands. |
| Francis | United Kingdom | The ship ran aground on the Whitby Rock. She was refloated and resumed her voyage from Hartlepool, County Durham to Rouen, Seine-Inférieure, France. |
| Henry | United Kingdom | The ship was driven ashore in "Auder Bay". She was on a voyage from Boston, Lincolnshire to Hull, Yorkshire. |
| Hoffnung | Stettin | The ship sank east of Alt Skagen. She was on a voyage from London, United Kingdom to Stettin. |
| Leda | United Kingdom | The ship ran aground on the Whitby Rock. She was later refloated and resumed her voyage. |
| Pero | United Kingdom | The ship was abandoned in the Atlantic Ocean. Her crew were rescued by William and Mary (United Kingdom). Pero was on a voyage from Miramichi, New Brunswick, British North America to Penzance, Cornwall. |
| P. J. Nevins | United Kingdom | The brig was driven ashore near Edgartown, Massachusetts, United States. She was refloated. |
| Richard | United Kingdom | The ship ran aground on the Whitby Rock. She was on a voyage from South Shields, County Durham to Gibraltar. She was refloated and put back to South Shields. |
| Svea | Belgium | The ship departed from Fiume, Austrian Empire for a Belgian port. No further trace, presumed foundered with the loss of all hands. |
| Wear Packet | United Kingdom | The ship ran aground on the Inner Barber Sand, in the North Sea off the coast of Norfolk. She was on a voyage from Sunderland, County Durham to London. She was refloated and taken into Great Yarmouth, Norfolk. |

== 7 December ==
List of shipwrecks: 7 December 1842
| Ship | State | Description |
|---|---|---|
| Factor | United Kingdom | The ship was in collision with Lord Fitzgerald (United Kingdom) and was beached at Kenmore Point, County Galway. She was on a voyage from Galway to London. Factor was refloated on 9 December and proceeded on her voyage. |
| Mary Ann | United Kingdom | The ship ran aground at Pernambuco, Brazil and was severely damaged. She was condemned. |

== 8 December ==
List of shipwrecks: 8 December 1842
| Ship | State | Description |
|---|---|---|
| Confidence | United States | The schooner was abandoned in the Atlantic Ocean. Her crew were rescued by Alliance (United Kingdom). Confidence was on a voyage from New York to "Eggs Harbour". |
| Crown | United Kingdom | The ship was abandoned in the Atlantic Ocean. Her crew were rescued by Prince George (United Kingdom). Crown was on a voyage from Liverpool, Lancashire to Saint John, New Brunswick, British North America. |
| Ferdinand | Prussia | The ship was driven ashore in the Bay of Hornbeck. She was on a voyage from Dundee, Forfarshire, United Kingdom to Königsberg. She was refloated. |
| George Wallis | United Kingdom | The ship was wrecked in the Strait of Sunda. Her crew were rescued. She was on a voyage from London to China. The Malays plundered and burnt the wreck. |
| Jupiter | Danzig | The ship was wrecked near Leba, Prussia. Her crew were rescued. She was on a voyage from London to Danzig. |

== 9 December ==
List of shipwrecks: 9 December 1842
| Ship | State | Description |
|---|---|---|
| Amis Reunis | France | The ship was driven ashore at Dunkirk, Seine-Inférieure. She was on a voyage from Dunkirk to Nantes, Loire-Inférieure. She was refloated on 11 December and resumed her voyage. |
| Bonne Ste Anne | United Kingdom | The ship was driven ashore at Dunkirk. She was refloated on 11 December and proceeded on her voyage. |
| Queen Victoria | United Kingdom | The paddle steamer was driven ashore at Rhyl, Denbighshire. She was on a voyage from Dublin to Liverpool, Lancashire. |
| Singulaire | Spain | The ship was wrecked on the Patras Shoal, in the South China Sea. Her crew took to the boats. One boat reached Macao, those in the other boat were rescued on 23 December by Emma (United Kingdom). |

== 10 December ==
List of shipwrecks: 10 December 1842
| Ship | State | Description |
|---|---|---|
| Frederick | France | The ship was driven ashore and wrecked near Bône, Algeria. She was on a voyage from Marseille to Arles, Bouches-du-Rhône. |
| Jupiter | Danzig | The ship was driven ashore at Ossecken, Prussia. Her crew were rescued. She was on a voyage from London, United Kingdom to Danzig. |
| Le Libere | France | The galiot caught fire and sank at Algiers, Algeria. |
| Tamar | (United Kingdom of Great Britain and Ireland) New South Wales | The whaler, a barque, was wrecked 80 nautical miles (150 km) west of Cape St. George, New Ireland. All on board were rescued by the brig Calypso ( (United Kingdom of Great Britain and Ireland) } New South Wales. |

== 11 December ==
List of shipwrecks: 11 December 1842
| Ship | State | Description |
|---|---|---|
| Crowley | United Kingdom | The ship was driven ashore and damaged at Blyth, Northumberland. She was refloated and towed into South Shields, County Durham. |
| Lightning | United Kingdom | The schooner was driven ashore at Flamborough Head, Yorkshire. She was refloated and resumed her voyage. |
| Lord Russell | United Kingdom | The ship was driven ashore and wrecked at "Dunwordley". Her crw were rescued. She was on a voyage from South Shields to Sligo. |
| Newcastle Trader | United Kingdom | The ship was driven ashore in Robin Hoods Bay, Yorkshire. She was on a voyage from South Shields to Newcastle upon Tyne, Northumberland. She was refloated and towed into Scarborough, Yorkshire. |
| William and Jane | United Kingdom | The ship was driven ashore at Portmadoc, Caernarfonshire. She was on a voyage from Flint to Rouen, Seine-Inférieure, France. She was later refloated. |

== 12 December ==
List of shipwrecks: 12 December 1842
| Ship | State | Description |
|---|---|---|
| John and Marianne | United Kingdom | The ship was wrecked at Solva, Pembrokeshire. She was on a voyage from Bangor to Swansea, Glamorgan. |
| Margaret and Jane | (United Kingdom of Great Britain and Ireland) British North America | The ship was wrecked near Lower Island Cove, Newfoundland with the loss of two of her crew. She was on a voyage from Saint John's to Harbour Grace. |
| Mary | United Kingdom | The sloop was driven ashore in Montrose Basin. Her crew were rescued by the Montrose Lifeboat. She was on a voyage from Belfast, County Antrim to Montrose, Forfarshire. She had become a wreck by 16 December. |
| Scotia | United Kingdom | The ship was driven ashore at Bridlington, Yorkshire. She was on a voyage from Newcastle upon Tyne, Northumberland to Rouen, Seine-Inférieure, France. She was refloated and resumed her voyage. |

== 13 December ==
List of shipwrecks: 13 December 1842
| Ship | State | Description |
|---|---|---|
| Ann | United Kingdom | The schooner was driven ashore at Arbroath, Forfarshire. She was on a voyage from Newcastle upon Tyne, Northumberland to Arbroath. |
| Anna | United Kingdom | The ship ran aground on the Holm Sand, in the North Sea off the coast of Norfolk. She was refloated on 15 December and proceeded on her voyage. |
| Columbine | United Kingdom | The ship was driven ashore at Ramsey, Isle of Man. She was on a voyage from Glasgow, Renfrewshire to Liverpool, Lancashire. |
| Mary Ann | United Kingdom | The brig ran aground on the Barnard Sand, in the North Sea off the coast of Norfolk. She was on a voyage from Newcastle upon Tyne, Northumberland to Montevideo, Uruguay. She was refloated and taken into Great Yarmouth, Norfolk. Following repairs, she resumed her voyage on 30 April 1843. |
| Mary Ann | United Kingdom | The brig was driven ashore in a capsized condition at Balranald, North Uist, Outer Hebrides. All hands presumed to have perished. |
| Parken | United Kingdom | The ship struck the Shipwash Sand, in the North Sea off the coast of Suffolk and consequently foundered off Sizewell. Her crew were rescued. She was on a voyage from Sunderland, County Durham to London. |

== 14 December ==
List of shipwrecks: 14 December 1842
| Ship | State | Description |
|---|---|---|
| NRP Amelia | Portuguese Navy | The schooner was wrecked on a reef off Benguela, Portuguese West Africa. Her crew were rescued. |
| Anne | United Kingdom | The ship was driven ashore and wrecked at Arbroath, Forfarshire. She was on a voyage from Newcastle upon Tyne, Northumberland to Arbroath. |
| Charlotte Newman | United Kingdom | The sloop was driven ashore at Cushendall, County Antrim. Her crew were rescued. She was on a voyage from a Scottish port to Larne, County Antrim. |
| Columbine | United Kingdom | The ship sprang a leak and was beached near Ramsey, Isle of Man. She was on a voyage from Glasgow, Renfrewshire to Liverpool, Lancashire. |
| Wave | United Kingdom | The ship ran aground on the Oessels Reef, 3 leagues (9 nautical miles (17 km) west of Domesnes, Norway. Her crew were rescued. She was on a voyage from Riga, Russia to Hull, Yorkshire. |

== 15 December ==
List of shipwrecks: 15 December 1842
| Ship | State | Description |
|---|---|---|
| Charles V | Spain | The ship was wrecked off "Caesar's Creek", Florida Territory. She was on a voyage from Havana, Cuba to Antwerp, Belgium. |
| Edward | Netherlands | The ship was driven ashore and wrecked at Messina, Sicily. Her crew were rescued. She was on a voyage from Odesa to Livorno, Grand Duchy of Tuscany. |
| Goede Hoffnung | Hamburg | The ship was driven ashore and wrecked at Cefn Sidan, Pembrokeshire, United Kingdom. Her crew were rescued. She was on a voyage from Livorno, Grand Duchy of Tuscany to Hamburg. |
| Jeune Cora | France | The ship was wrecked at Cape Santa Maria, Uruguay. Her crew were rescued. |
| Louisa Conolly | United Kingdom | The schooner ran aground and was wrecked at Ballyshannon, County Donegal. |
| Marie | Sweden | The ship ran aground on the Nidingens and was damaged. She was on a voyage from Visby to London, United Kingdom. Marie was refloated and out into "Skalla". |
| Norfolk | United Kingdom | The ship ran aground on the Whitby Rock and was damaged. She was refloated. |
| Vermont | United States | The ship was driven ashore and wrecked at Ballyteague, County Kildare, United Kingdom. Her fifteen crew were rescued. She was on a voyage from Savannah, Georgia to Liverpool, Lancashire, United Kingdom. |

== 16 December ==
List of shipwrecks: 16 December 1842
| Ship | State | Description |
|---|---|---|
| Amelia | United Kingdom | The ship was driven ashore at "Nahr", Sweden. She was refloated on 20 December and resumed her voyage. |
| Brazilian | France | The ship was wrecked on the Patch Sandbank, in the Bristol Channel off the coast of Glamorgan, United Kingdom. Her crew were rescued. She was on a voyage from Havre de Grâce, Seine-Inférieure to Port-au-Prince, Haiti. |
| Caledonia | United Kingdom | The full-rigged ship was driven ashore at Rackwick, Hoy, Orkney Islands. Her 21 crew were rescued. She was on a voyage from Quebec City, Province of Canada, British North America to Greenock, Renfrewshire. |
| Glenesk | United Kingdom | The schooner was stranded and became a total wreck south of Östergarn Lighthouse on Gotland, Sweden. She was on a voyage from Riga, Russia to Montrose, Forfarshire; the crew were rescued. |
| Iris | (Russian Empire) Grand Duchy of Finland | The schooner was destroyed by fire at Klintehamn, Sweden. |
| Thomas Richardson | United Kingdom | The ship foundered in the Atlantic Ocean off Eagle Island, County Mayo with the loss of two of her crew. She was on a voyage from Galway to Westport, County Mayo. |

== 17 December ==
List of shipwrecks: 17 December 1842
| Ship | State | Description |
|---|---|---|
| Caledonian | United Kingdom | The ship was driven ashore and wrecked in Rackwick Bay, Orkney Islands. Her crew were rescued. She was on a voyage from Chaleur Bay to the Clyde. |
| Frances | United Kingdom | The ship was abandoned in the Atlantic Ocean. Her crew were rescued. She was on a voyage from Liverpool, Lancashire to Savannah, Georgia, United States. |
| John Askew | United Kingdom | The ship sprang a leak and sank in Port Yarrock Bay. Her crew were rescued. She was on a voyage from Creetown, Kirkcudbrightshire to Liverpool, Lancashire. |
| Montrose | United Kingdom | The ship was abandoned in the Atlantic Ocean. Her crew were rescued by Ararat (United Kingdom). Montrose was on a voyage from Liverpool, Lancashire to New Orleans, Louisiana, United States. |
| Thetis | (United Kingdom of Great Britain and Ireland) British North America | The ship was driven ashore at Cape Chat, Province of Canada. She was later refloated and taken into Cap-Chat, where she had become a wreck by 17 January 1843. |
| 574 | United Kingdom | The ship was driven ashore at Sunderland, County Durham. She was refloated and towed into Sunderland. |

== 18 December ==
List of shipwrecks: 18 December 1842
| Ship | State | Description |
|---|---|---|
| Anna Catherina | Hamburg | The ship was driven ashore and wrecked 4 nautical miles (7.4 km) east of Dunbar, Lothian, United Kingdom. She was on a voyage from Clackmannan to Altona. |
| Cuba | United Kingdom | The ship was beached and Berbice, British Honduras. She was on a voyage from Berbice to London. |

== 19 December ==
List of shipwrecks: 19 December 1842
| Ship | State | Description |
|---|---|---|
| Ellen | United Kingdom | The ship struck the Black Rock. She was on a voyage from Liverpool, Lancashire to Cork. She was refloated and taken into Youghal, County Cork. |
| Isabella | United Kingdom | The ship was wrecked on the Zeehondplaat, in the North Sea off the Dutch coast. Her crew were rescued. She was on a voyage from London to Rotterdam, South Holland, Netherlands. |
| Scotia | United Kingdom | The ship ran aground on the Goodwin Sands, Kent. She was on a voyage from Rotterdam, South Holland, Netherlands to Mobile, Alabama, United States. She was refloated and resumed her voyage. |

== 20 December ==
List of shipwrecks: 20 December 1842
| Ship | State | Description |
|---|---|---|
| Fortuna | Prussia | The ship ran aground at Memel. She was refloated and resumed her voyage. |
| Highlander | United Kingdom | The brig struck rocks off Sanday, Orkney Islands and was damaged. She was on a voyage from Riga, Russia to Liverpool, Lancashire. She put into Stromness, Orkey Islands for repairs. |
| Lamb | United Kingdom | The ship was driven ashore at Hayle, Cornwall. |
| Sarah Dearing | United States | The ship was wrecked on Fuerteventura, Canary Islands. Her crew were rescued. |

== 21 December ==
List of shipwrecks: 21 December 1842
| Ship | State | Description |
|---|---|---|
| Charlotte | Denmark | The ship was wrecked on the Skagen Reef. Her crew were rescued. She was on a voyage from Trapani, Sicily to Copenhagen. |
| Conch | United Kingdom | The ship departed from Algoa Bay for Port Natal. No further trace, presumed foundered with the loss of all hands. |
| Peruvian | France | The ship was driven ashore near Octeville, Manche. She was on a voyage from New Orleans, Louisiana, United States to Havre de Grâce, Seine-Inférieure. |
| Vulcan | United Kingdom | The sloop ran aground in the Sound of Sunda. She was refloated and resumed her voyage. |

== 22 December ==
List of shipwrecks: 22 December 1842
| Ship | State | Description |
|---|---|---|
| Agnes | United Kingdom | The schooner was in collision with the brig Jennett (United Kingdom) and foundered in the North Sea off the Dudgeon Lightship ( Trinity House). Her four crew were rescued. She was on a voyage from Perth to London. |
| Four Brothers | (United Kingdom of Great Britain and Ireland) British North America | The ship was driven ashore on St John's Island, off Port La Tour, Nova Scotia. Her crew were rescued. She was on a voyage from Trinidad to Halifax, Nova Scotia. |
| Hector | United Kingdom | The brig was wrecked off "Lapello Island", United States. She was on a voyage from Liverpool, Lancashire to Savannah, Georgia, United States. |
| Navarin | Danzig | The ship ran aground at Falsterbo, Sweden and was wrecked. She was on a voyage from Danzig to an English port. |
| Traveller | United Kingdom | The ship ran aground and capsized at Glasson Dock, Lancashire. Her crew were rescued. She was on a voyage from Miramichi, New Brunswick to Glasson Dock. Traveller was righted on 23 December. |

== 23 December ==
List of shipwrecks: 23 December 1842
| Ship | State | Description |
|---|---|---|
| Cosmopolite | United Kingdom | The ship was beached at Kilrush, County Clare. She was on a voyage from Quebec City, Province of Canada, British North America to Limerick. |
| Helen | United Kingdom | The ship was driven ashore on Benbecula, Outer Hebrides. She was on a voyage from the Clyde to Limerick. |
| Lansdowne | United Kingdom | The ship was driven ashore and wrecked on Benbecula. Her crew were rescued. She was on a voyage from Liverpool, Lancashire to Limerick. |
| San Joao Baptista | Portugal | The ship was wrecked on the Felquiras Rock. Her crew were rescued. |

== 24 December ==
List of shipwrecks: 24 December 1842
| Ship | State | Description |
|---|---|---|
| Agnes | United Kingdom | The ship collided with Jannett (United Kingdom) and foundered in the North Sea off the Dudgeon Lightship ( Trinity House). Her crew survived. She was on a voyage from Perth to London. |
| Alchymist | United Kingdom | The ship ran aground in the Marabout Channel and sank. Her crew survived She was on a voyage from Constantinople, Ottoman Empire to Alexandria, Egypt. She was later refloated and beached. |
| Effort | United Kingdom | The ship was driven ashore near Missolonghi, Greece. She was on a voyage from Patras, Greece to Trieste. |
| Eliza Ann | (United Kingdom of Great Britain and Ireland) British North America | The ship was wrecked at Biscay Bay, Newfoundland. Her crew were rescued. She was on a voyage from Saint John's, Newfoundland to Prince Edward Island. |
| Harvest Home | United Kingdom | The ship was wrecked whilst on a voyage from Buenos Aires, Argentina to Montevideo, Uruguay. |
| Orozimbo | United Kingdom | The ship ran aground at Chichester, Sussex and was damaged. She was on a voyage from London to Emsworth, Hampshire. |
| Seaflower | United Kingdom | The ship was wrecked at Trepassey, Newfoundland. Her crew were rescued. She was on a voyage from Saint John's to Sydney, Nova Scotia. |

== 25 December ==
List of shipwrecks: 25 December 1842
| Ship | State | Description |
|---|---|---|
| Vrouw Elida | Belgium | The ship sprang a leak and foundered west north west of Fehmarn, Duchy of Schleswig. Her crew were rescued. She was on a voyage from Königsberg, Prussia to Antwerp. |

== 26 December ==
List of shipwrecks: 26 December 1842
| Ship | State | Description |
|---|---|---|
| Alexander | United Kingdom | The barque sprang a leak and foundered in the Atlantic Ocean 170 nautical miles (310 km) north west by west of Cape St. Vincent, Spain. Her crew were rescued by the brig Sirius (Denmark). Alexander was on a voyage from Liverpool, Lancashire to Trieste. |
| Dina | United Kingdom | The ship was wrecked on the Ginger Key. Her crew were rescued. She was on a voyage from Liverpool to Matanzas, Captaincy General of Cuba. |
| Herald | United Kingdom | The ship was wrecked on Elliott Key. She was on a voyage from Veracruz, Mexico to Swansea, Glamorgan. |
| Isaac Mead | United States | The ship ran aground on Washermen's Reef. She was on a voyage from Marseille, Bouches-du-Rhône, France to New Orleans, Louisiana. She was refloated on 29 December and taken into Key West, Florida Territory. |
| John and Elizabeth | United Kingdom | The brig ran aground on the Barnard Sand, in the North Sea off the coast of Norfolk. She was on a voyage from Montrose, Forfarshire to London. She was refloated on 28 December but was consequently beached at Great Yarmouth, Norfolk. |

== 27 December ==
List of shipwrecks: 27 December 1842
| Ship | State | Description |
|---|---|---|
| Ellen | United Kingdom | The ship ran aground on the Shoebury Knock, off the coast of Essex. |
| Hector | United Kingdom | The brig was wrecked on Blackbeard Island, Georgia, United States. She was on a voyage from Liverpool, Lancashire to Savannah, Georgia. |
| Prins Frederik der Nederlanden | Netherlands | The ship was wrecked on a reef off Macao. Her crew were rescued by Andromache (United Kingdom). Prins Frederik der Nederlanden was on a voyage from Batavia, Netherlands East Indies to Macao. |

== 28 December ==
List of shipwrecks: 28 December 1842
| Ship | State | Description |
|---|---|---|
| Charles | United Kingdom | The ship was driven ashore at the Devil's Tongue, Gibraltar. She was on a voyage from Marseille, Bouches-du-Rhône, France to London. She was refloated. |
| Indemnity | United Kingdom | The ship ran aground on Bantry Brigg and was severely damaged. She was on a voyage from Dublin to South Shields, County Durham. She was refloated and put into Stromness, Orkney Islands. |
| Kitty and Peggy | United Kingdom | The ship collided with Queen of the Isle ( (United Kingdom of Great Britain and Ireland) Isle of Man) and foundered in the Irish Sea off the Isle of Man. She was on a voyage from Maryport, Cumberland to Douglas, Isle of Man. Kitty and Peggy was refloated on 1 January 1843 and taken into Douglas. |
| Maria | United Kingdom | The ship was driven ashore and wrecked at Pozzallo, Sicily with the loss of three of her crew. She was on a voyage from Odesa to Cork or Falmouth, Cornwall. |
| Sisters | United Kingdom | The ship ran aground and capsized at Maryport. She was on a voyage from Belfast, County Antrim to Maryport. She was later righted. |

== 29 December ==
List of shipwrecks: 29 December 1842
| Ship | State | Description |
|---|---|---|
| Agnes | United Kingdom | The ship ran aground and sank at Arbroath, Forfarshire. She was on a voyage from South Shields, County Durham to Arbroath. She was subsequently refloated and taken into Arbroath. |
| Falcon | United Kingdom | The ship was driven ashore at St. Steffano Point, Ottoman Empire. She was on a voyage from Odesa to Cork and Falmouth, Cornwall. She was refloated on 31 December. |
| James Kerr | (United Kingdom of Great Britain and Ireland) British North America | The ship was driven ashore and wrecked near Country Harbour, Nova Scotia. Her crew were rescued. |
| Sapphire | United Kingdom | The schooner was sighted off the Isle of Man whilst on a voyage from Liverpool, Lancashire to the Clyde. No further trace, presumed foundered with the loss of all hands. |
| Victoria | United States | The ship was driven ashore and severely damaged in Widewall Bay, Orkney Islands, United Kingdom. She was on a voyage from Saint Petersburg, Russia to Boston, Massachusetts. |
| William and Nancy | United Kingdom | The sloop was driven ashore and severely damaged at Llanmaddoch, Glamorgan. Her crew were rescued. She was on a voyage from Llanelly to Swansea. She was refloated on 4 January 1843. |

== 30 December ==
List of shipwrecks: 30 December 1842
| Ship | State | Description |
|---|---|---|
| Coralie | France | The ship was wrecked at Algiers, Algeria. |
| Dennett | United Kingdom | The ship departed from Aveiro, Portugal for Liverpool, Lancashire. No further trace, presumed foundered with the loss of all hands. |
| John and Elizabeth | United Kingdom | The ship ran aground on the Corton Sand, in the North Sea off the coast of Suffolk. She was on a voyage from Montrose, Forfarshire to London. John and Elizabeth was refloated and taken into Great Yarmouth, Norfolk. |
| Marie Catherine | France | The ship was driven ashore at Bayonne, Basses-Pyrénées. She was on a voyage from Bayonne to Montevideo, Uruguay. |

== 31 December ==
List of shipwrecks: 31 December 1842
| Ship | State | Description |
|---|---|---|
| Friend's Glory | United Kingdom | The ship was driven ashore and wrecked on Terschelling, Friesland, Netherlands. Her three crew were rescued. She was on a voyage from Grangemouth, Stirlingshire to Berwick upon Tweed, Northumberland. |
| Laurel | United Kingdom | The ship was beached on Colonsay. She was on a voyage from Ballina, County Mayo to Liverpool, Lancashire. Laurel capsized on 22 January and was wrecked. |
| Oberon | United Kingdom | The ship ran aground on the Shipwash Sand, in the North Sea off the coast of Essex. She was on a voyage from South Shields, County Durham to Palermo, Sicily. She was refloated and taken into Harwich, Essex. |

== Unknown date ==
List of shipwrecks: Unknown date in December 1842
| Ship | State | Description |
|---|---|---|
| Albion | (United Kingdom of Great Britain and Ireland) British North America | The ship was driven ashore and severely damaged at Eastport, Maine, United States. |
| Ariadne | (United Kingdom of Great Britain and Ireland) British North America | The ship was driven ashore and wrecked at Eastport. |
| Bresilien | United Kingdom | The ship was driven ashore and wrecked at Neath, Glamorgan before 24 December. |
| Clark | United States | The ship was wrecked near Saint John, New Brunswick, British North America with the loss of six lives. |
| Dolphin | (United Kingdom of Great Britain and Ireland) British North America | The ship was wrecked at Gardner Creek, New Brunswick. Her crew were rescued. She was on a voyage from Shubenacadie, Nova Scotia to Eastport, Maine, United States. |
| Euphrasia | United Kingdom | The ship was driven ashore at Algeciras, Spain before 8 December. She was consequently condemned. |
| Fame | United Kingdom | The ship sprang a leak in the Strait of Sunda. She punt into the Cocos Island and was abandoned as there were no facilities to repair her. |
| Henrietta Alice Carolina | (United Kingdom of Great Britain and Ireland) British North America | The ship was abandoned in the Atlantic Ocean before 18 December. |
| Irma | United Kingdom | The ship was wrecked at the mouth of the River Plate before 12 December. All on board were rescued. She was on a voyage from Rio de Janeiro, Brazil to Montevideo, Uruguay. |
| Isidore | United States | The ship was driven ashore and wrecked at Kennebunk, Maine with the loss of all fifteen people on board. |
| Juno | Stettin | The ship foundered in the North Sea on or before 14 December. Her crew were rescued. She was on a voyage from Hull, Yorkshire, United Kingdom to Stettin. |
| Maria | Spain | The barque was lost on a voyage from China to Manila, Spanish East Indies. |
| Milwaukie | United States | The ship foundered in Lake Michigan before 6 December with the loss of nine lives. |
| Oxford | United Kingdom | The barque was lost off St Ubes, Portugal. All on board were rescued. |
| Paramoun | France | The ship was wrecked at "Cannague" with the loss of twelve of her crew. |
| Pero | United Kingdom | The barque was abandoned in the Atlantic Ocean before 20 December. Her crew were rescued by William and Mary (United Kingdom). Pero was on a voyage from Miramichi, New Brunswick, British North America to Penzance, Cornwall. |
| Porcupine | United Kingdom | The ship was driven ashore on Mytilene, Greece before 14 December. She was refloated and resumed her voyage. |
| Prince Albert | United Kingdom | The ship was wrecked at Tampico, Mexico. She was on a voyage from Liverpool, Lancashire to Tampico. |
| Queen Victoria | United Kingdom | The ship was wrecked near Mytilene, Greece before 29 December. Her crew were rescued. |
| Rapide | Belgium | The ship was wrecked in the Black Sea. Her crew were rescued. She was on a voyage from Odesa to Marseille, Bouches-du-Rhône, France. |
| Riga | United Kingdom | The ship ran aground on the Gunfleet Sand, in the North Sea off the coast of Essex. She was on a voyage from South Shields, County Durham to London. She was refloated on 18 December and proceeded on her voyage. |
| Sabini | Spain | The ship was wrecked off the Cape of Good Hope. Her sixteen crew were rescued by Danaé (French Navy). |
| Tanner | (United Kingdom of Great Britain and Ireland) British North America | The ship was driven ashore at "Guaco". She was on a voyage from Petitcodiac, New Brunswick to Saint John, New Brunswick. |
