= Lublewo =

Lublewo may refer to the following places in Poland:

- Lublewo Gdańskie
- Lublewo Lęborskie
