= Jackowo, Pomeranian Voivodeship =

Jackowo
- Village
- Location within Poland
- Coordinates: 54°45′56″N 17°49′54″E
- Country: Poland
- Voivodeship: Pomeranian
- County: Wejherowo
- Gmina: Choczewo
- Population: 283

Jackowo [jat͡sˈkɔvɔ] is a village in the administrative district of Gmina Choczewo, within Wejherowo County, Pomeranian Voivodeship, in northern Poland.

For details of the history of the region, see History of Pomerania.
