= Gmina Choczewo =

Gmina Choczewo Choczewo Commune
- Gmina
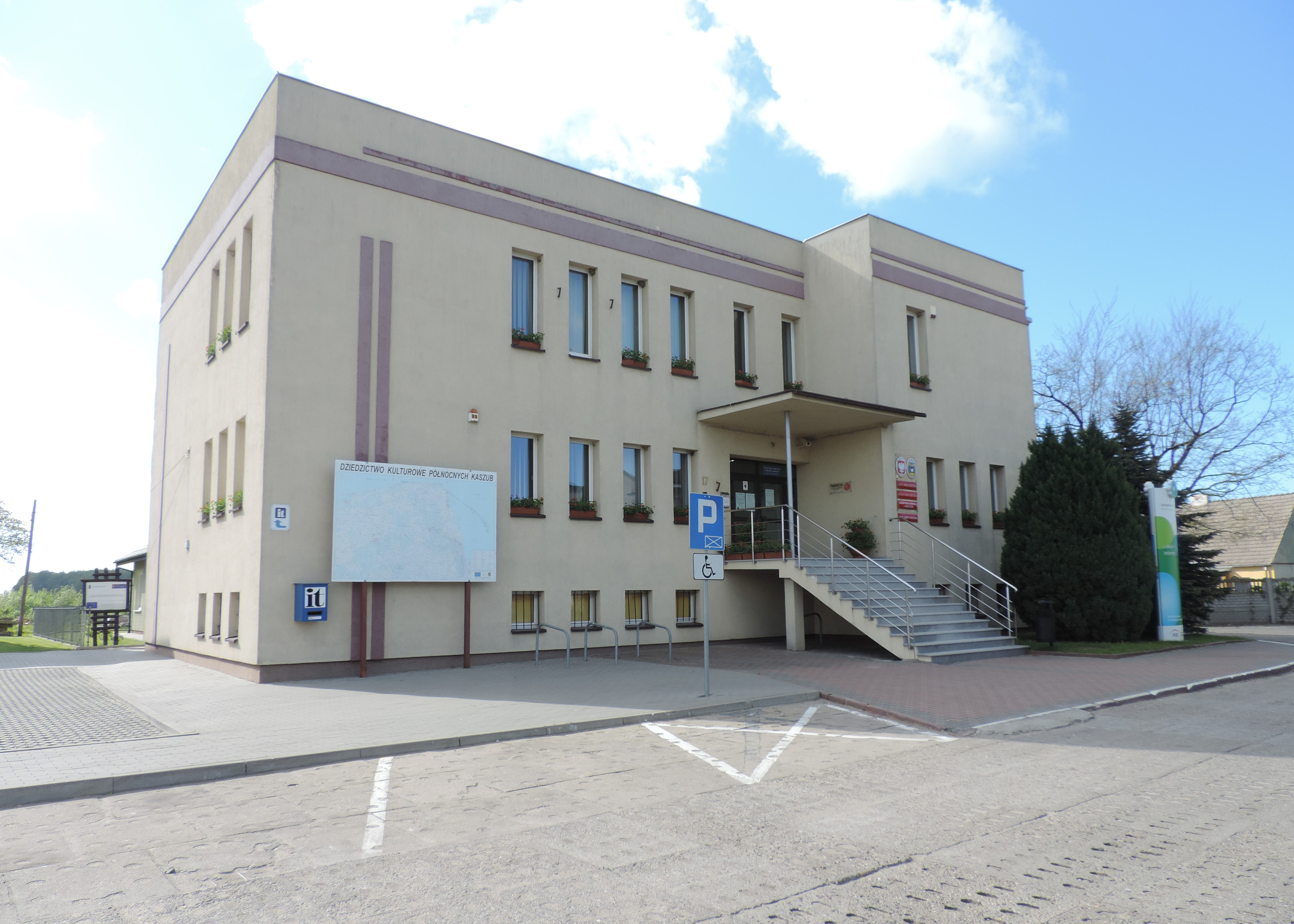
- Gmina office in Choczewo

- Coat of arms
- Interactive map of Gmina Choczewo
- Coordinates (Choczewo): 54°44′27″N 17°53′31″E
- Country: Poland
- Voivodeship: Pomeranian
- County: Wejherowo
- Seat: Choczewo

Area
  - Total: 183.23 km^{2} (70.75 sq mi)

Population (2006)
  - Total: 5,503
  - Density: 30.03/km^{2} (77.79/sq mi)
- Time zone: UTC+1 (CET)
  - Summer (DST): UTC+2 (CEST)
- Vehicle registration: GWE
- Website: http://www.choczewo.com.pl

Gmina Choczewo (Kashubian: Chòczewò) is a rural gmina (administrative district) in Wejherowo County, Pomeranian Voivodeship, in northern Poland. Its seat is the village of Choczewo, which lies approximately 28 kilometres (17 mi) northwest of Wejherowo and 64 km (40 mi) northwest of the regional capital Gdańsk.

The gmina covers an area of 183.23 square kilometres (70.7 sq mi), and its total population was 5,503 as of 2006.

== Villages ==
Gmina Choczewo contains the villages and settlements of Biebrowo, Borkowo Lęborskie, Borkowo Małe, Brachówko, Cegielnia, Choczewko, Choczewo, Ciekocinko, Ciekocino, Gardkowice, Gościęcino, Jabłonowice, Jackowo, Karczemka Gardkowska, Karczemka Kierzkowska, Kierzkowo, Kierzkowo Małe, Kopalino, Krzesiniec, Kurowo, Łętówko, Łętowo, Lubiatowo, Lublewko, Lublewo Lęborskie, Osetnik, Osieki Lęborskie, Przebędówko, Przebędowo, Sasinko, Sasino, Sasino-Kolonia, Słajkowo, Słajszewko, Słajszewo, Starbienino, Szklana Huta, Żelazna, Zwarcienko, Zwartówko, and Zwartowo.

== Neighbouring gminas ==
Gmina Choczewo is bordered by the town of Łeba and by the gminas of Gniewino, Krokowa, Łęczyce, Nowa Wieś Lęborska and Wicko.
