= Sasino =

- Village
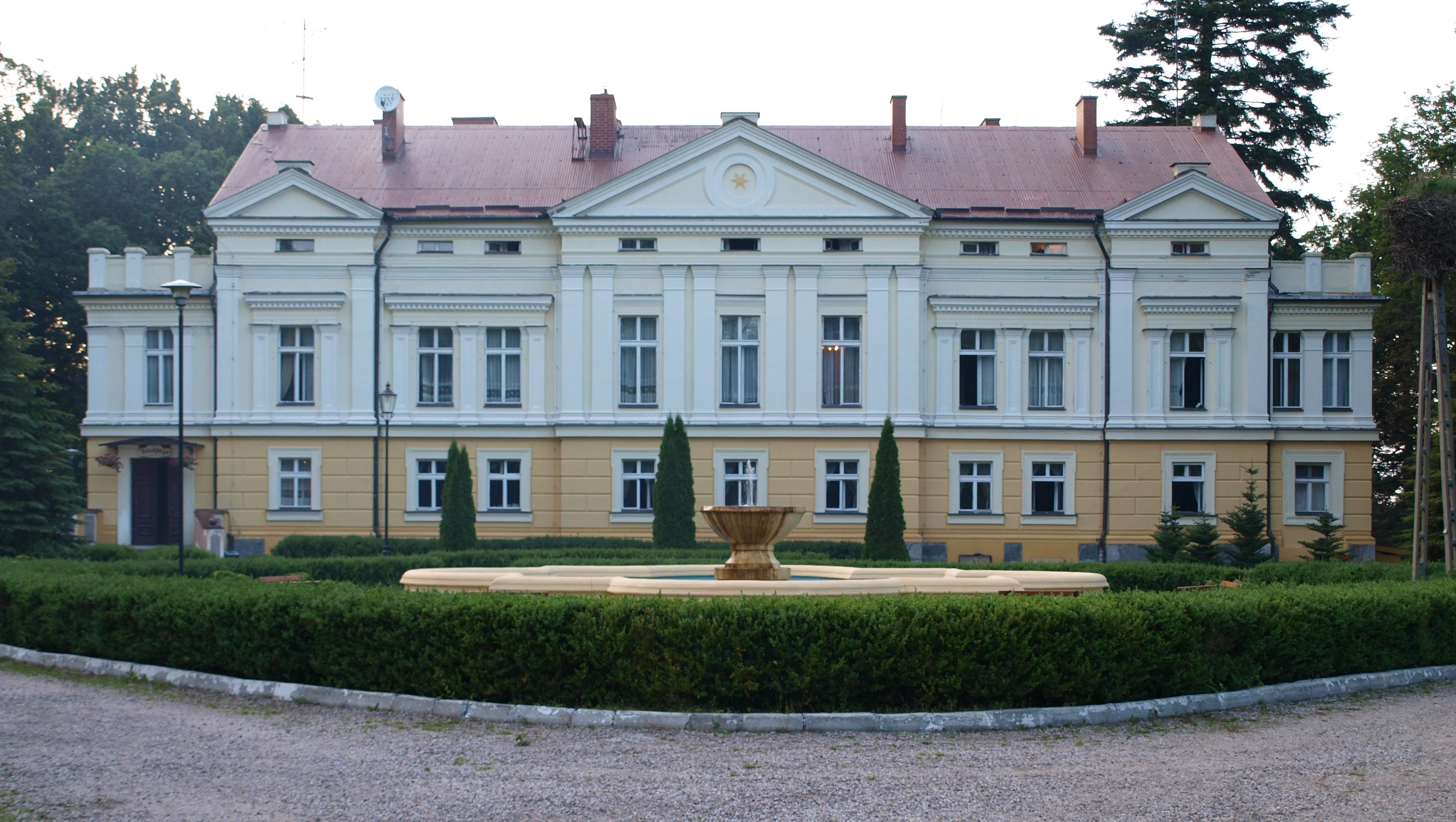
- Palace in Sasino

- Location within Poland
- Coordinates: 54°45′33″N 17°45′8″E
- Country: Poland
- Voivodeship: Pomeranian
- County: Wejherowo
- Gmina: Choczewo
- Population: 474

Sasino [saˈɕinɔ] (Kashubian: Sasëno, German: Sassin) is a village in the administrative district of Gmina Choczewo, within Wejherowo County, Pomeranian Voivodeship, in northern Poland.

== See also ==
- History of Pomerania
