= Ciekocino =

- Village
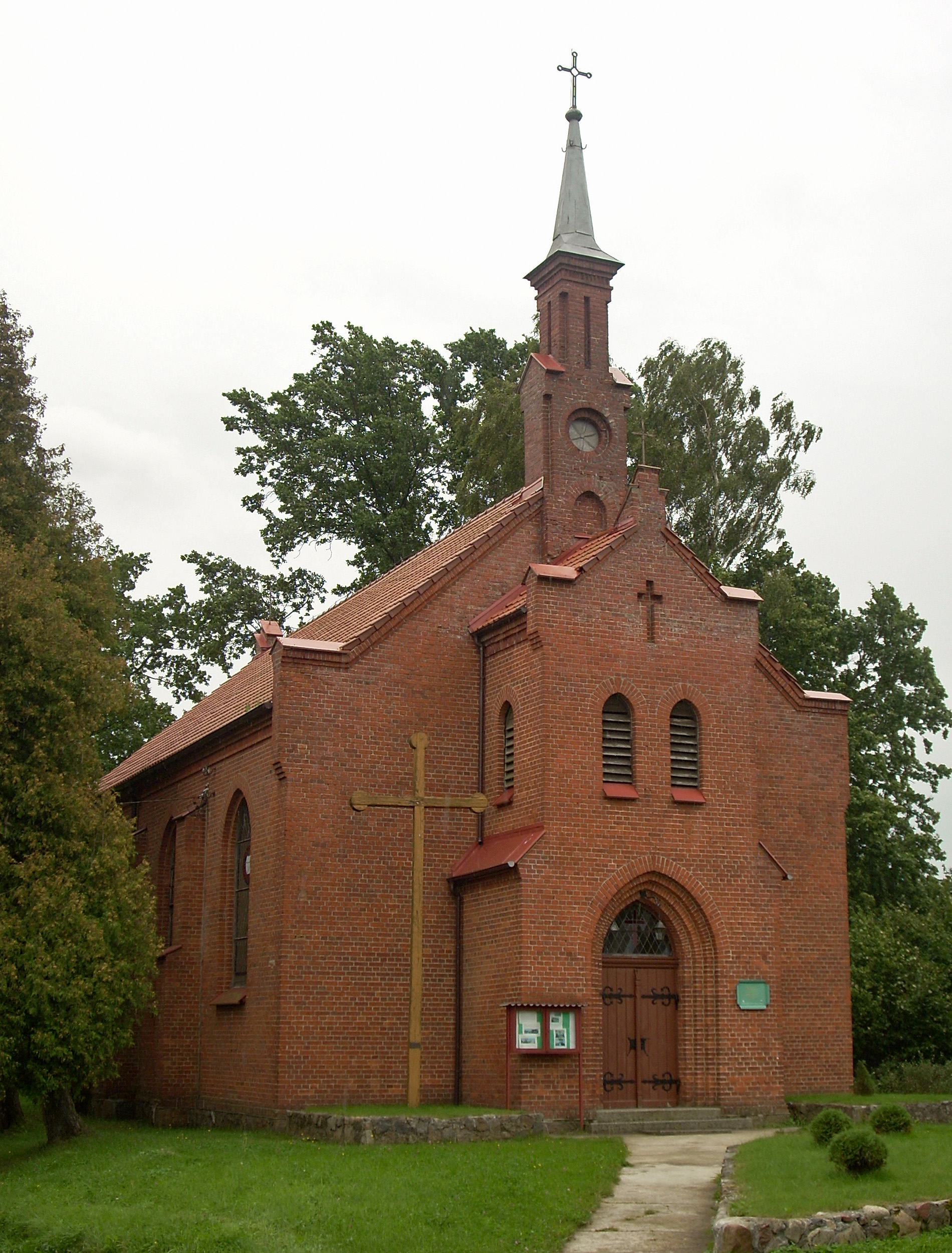
- Church in Ciekocino

- Location within Poland
- Coordinates: 54°45′22″N 17°47′20″E
- Country: Poland
- Voivodeship: Pomeranian
- County: Wejherowo
- Gmina: Choczewo
- Population: 95

Ciekocino [t͡ɕɛkɔˈt͡ɕinɔ] (German: Zackenzin) is a village in the administrative district of Gmina Choczewo, within Wejherowo County, Pomeranian Voivodeship, in northern Poland.

For details of the history of the region, see History of Pomerania.
