= Starbienino =

- Village
- Location within Poland
- Coordinates: 54°45′3″N 17°56′45″E
- Country: Poland
- Voivodeship: Pomeranian
- County: Wejherowo
- Gmina: Choczewo
- Population: 57

Starbienino [starbjɛˈninɔ] is a village in the administrative district of Gmina Choczewo, within Wejherowo County, Pomeranian Voivodeship, in northern Poland.

For details of the history of the region, see History of Pomerania.
