= Przebędowo railway station =

Railway station in Przebędowo Słupskie, Poland

Przebędowo

General information
- Location: Przebędowo; Poland
- Coordinates: 54.608447°N 17.469295°E
- Owner: Polskie Koleje Państwowe S.A.
- Platforms: None

Construction
- Structure type: Building: No; Depot: No; Water tower: No

History
- Former names: Prebendow (Kr. Stolp)
Location

Przebędowo is a non-operational PKP railway station in Przebędowo (Pomeranian Voivodeship), Poland.

== Lines crossing the station ==
Start station	End station	Line type
Słupsk	Cecenowo	Dismantled
