= Słajszewko =

- Settlement
- Location within Poland
- Coordinates: 54°45′51″N 17°47′7″E
- Country: Poland
- Voivodeship: Pomeranian
- County: Wejherowo
- Gmina: Choczewo
- Population: 143

Słajszewko [swai̯ˈʂɛfkɔ] is a settlement in the administrative district of Gmina Choczewo, within Wejherowo County, Pomeranian Voivodeship, in northern Poland.

For details of the history of the region, see History of Pomerania.
