= Osieki Lęborskie =

- Village
- Location within Poland
- Coordinates: 54°46′16″N 17°53′43″E
- Country: Poland
- Voivodeship: Pomeranian
- County: Wejherowo
- Gmina: Choczewo
- Population: 275

Osieki Lęborskie [ɔˈɕɛki lɛmˈbɔrskʲɛ] is a village in the administrative district of Gmina Choczewo, within Wejherowo County, Pomeranian Voivodeship, in northern Poland.

The village has a railway station on the disused Wejherowo to Garczegorze line (PKP rail line 230), although this lies more than a kilometre outside the village proper on the road between Osieki Lęborskie and Lublewo.

For details of the history of the region, see History of Pomerania.

== Images of Osieki Lęborskie ==
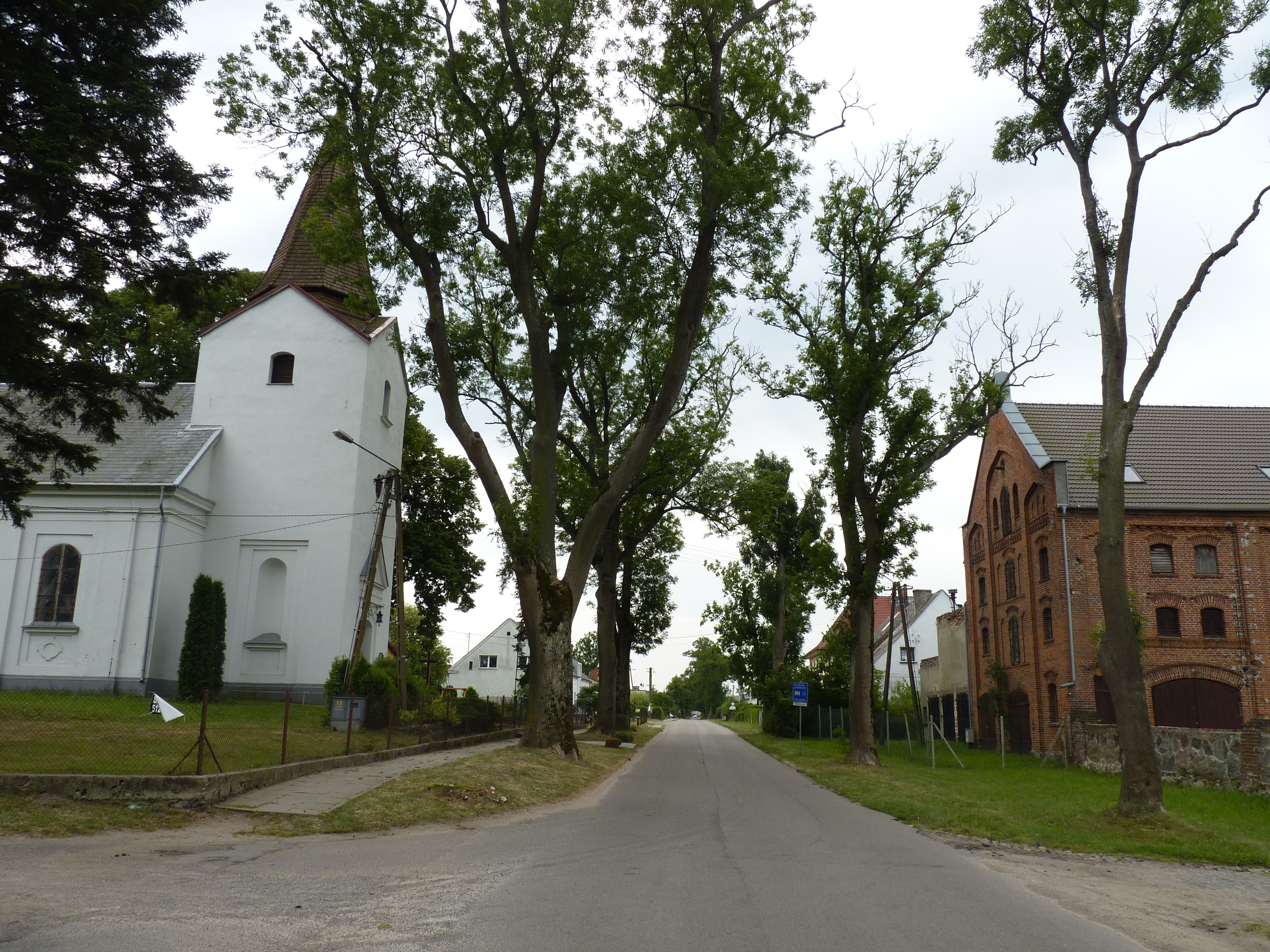
Osieki Lęborskie church, looking south along the road to Choczewo

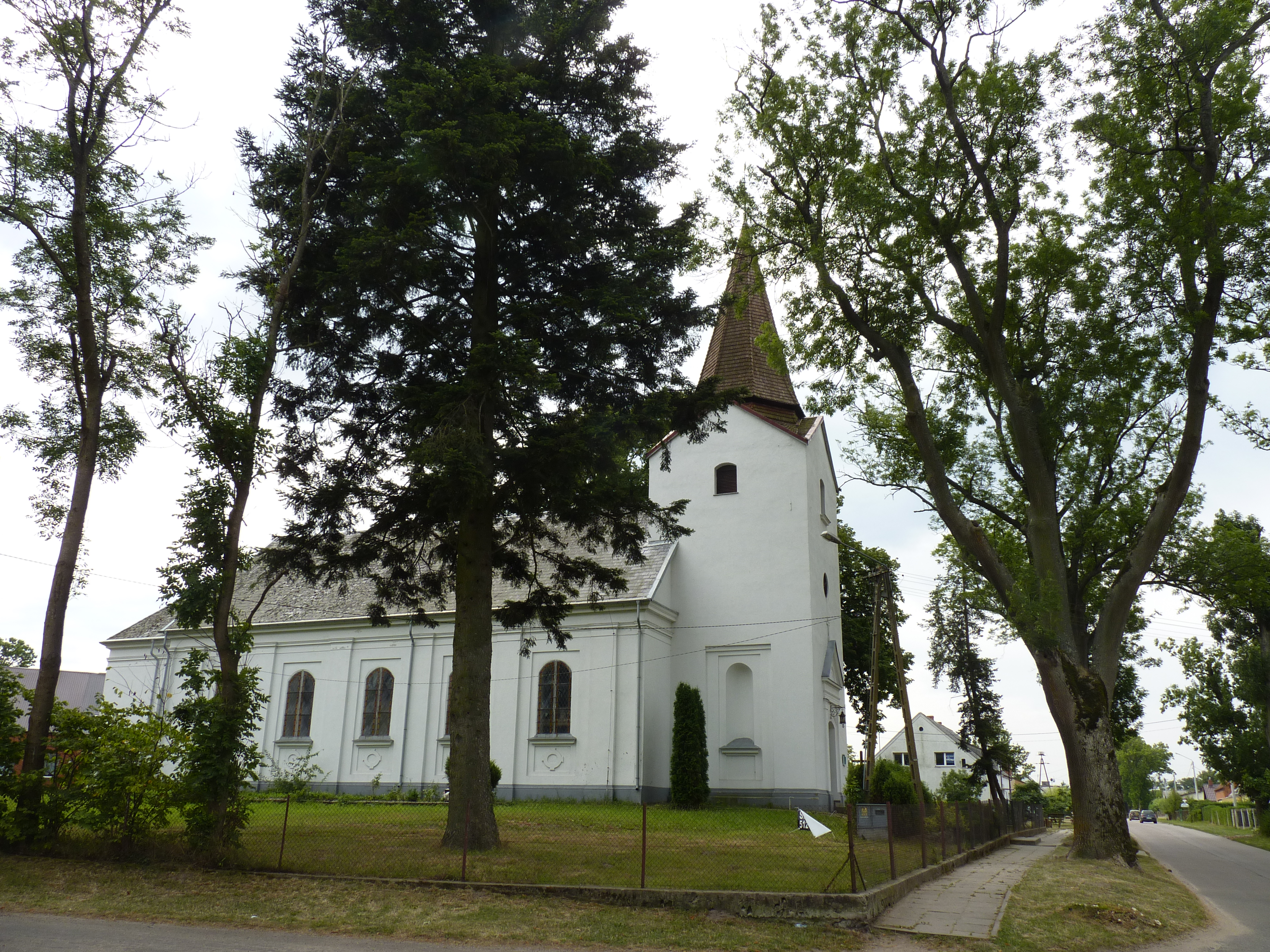
Osieki Lęborskie church, looking south along the road to Choczewo

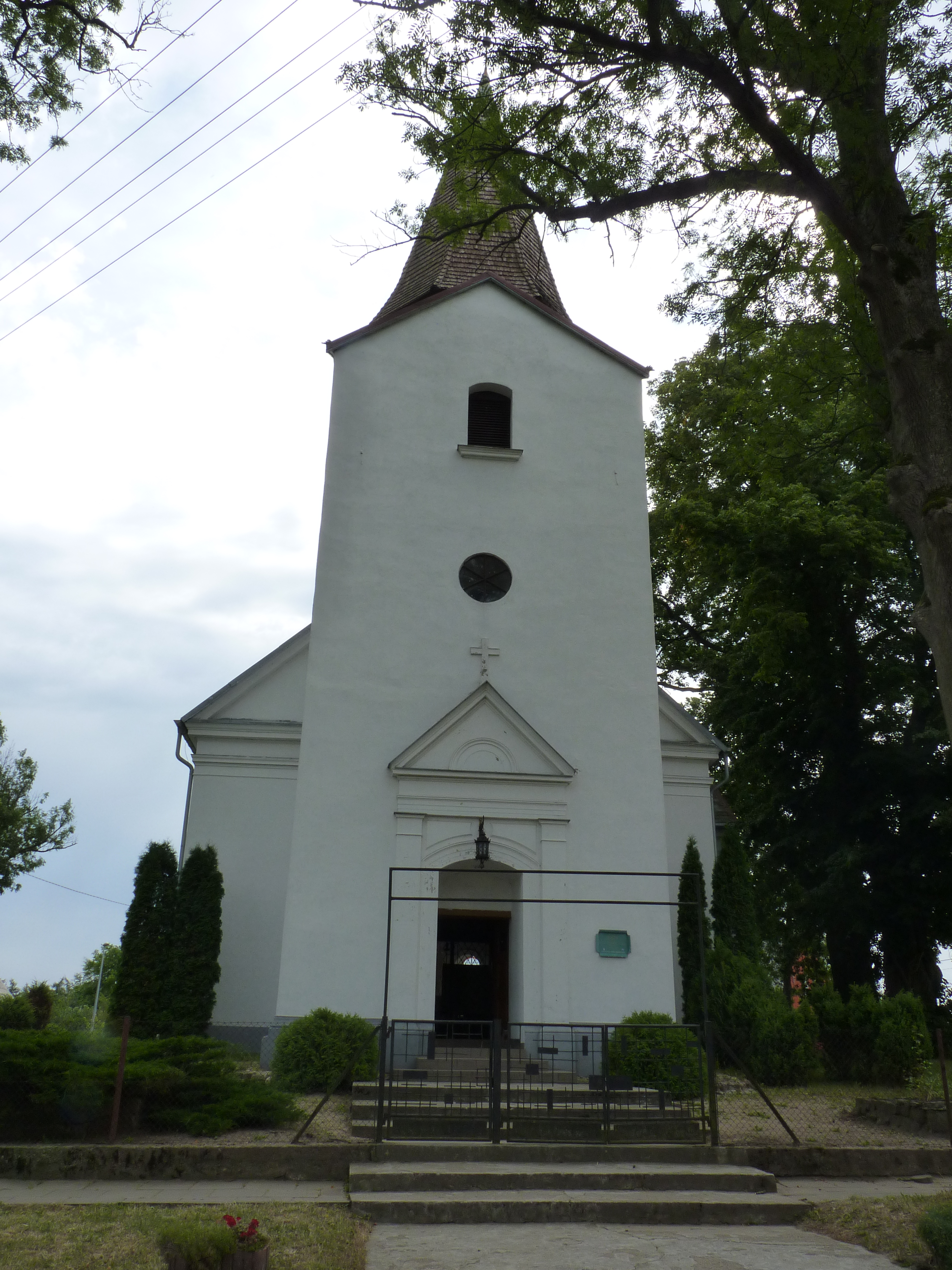
Osieki Lęborskie church, looking east from the road to Choczewo

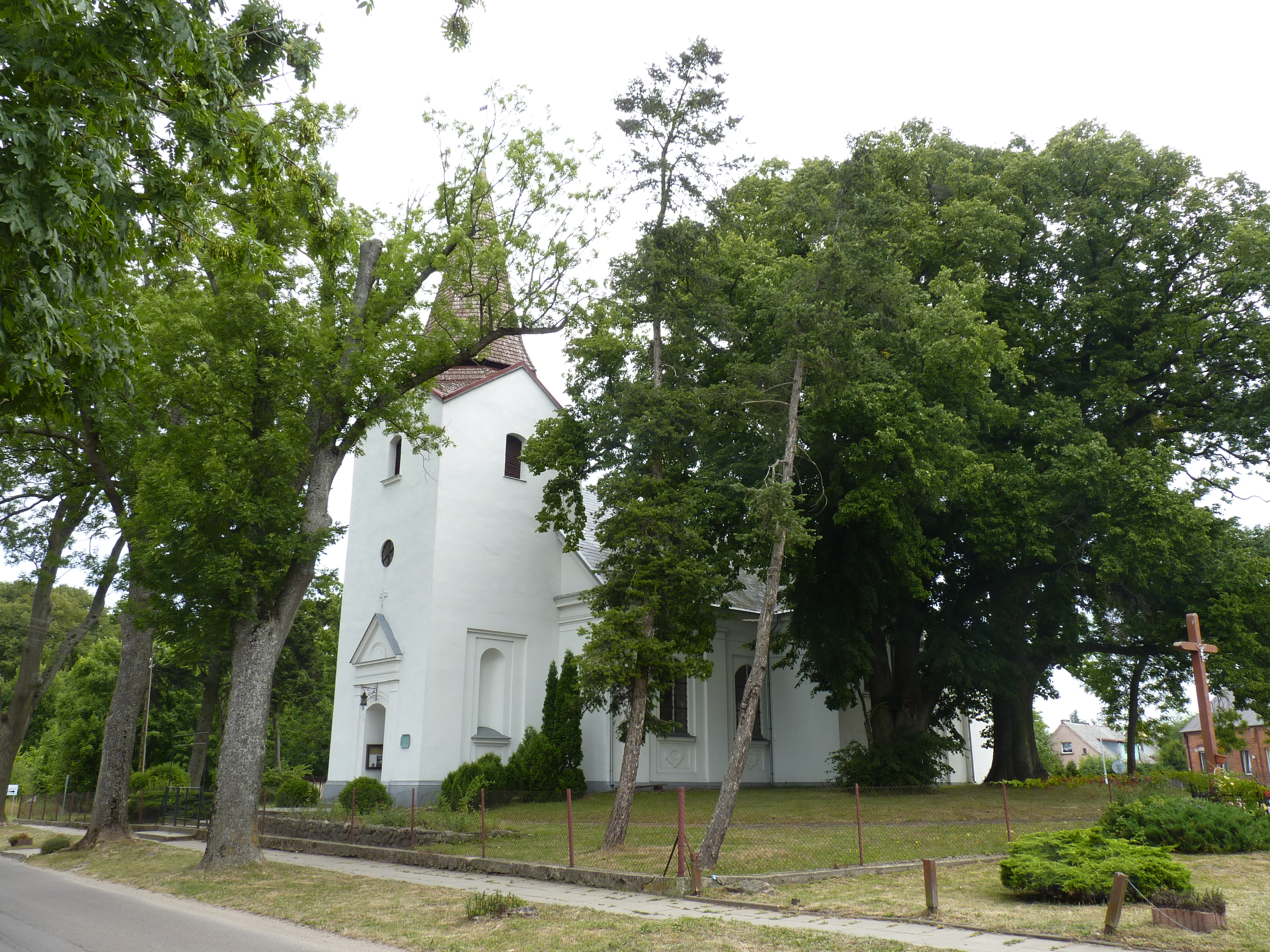
Osieki Lęborskie church, looking north along the road to Choczewo

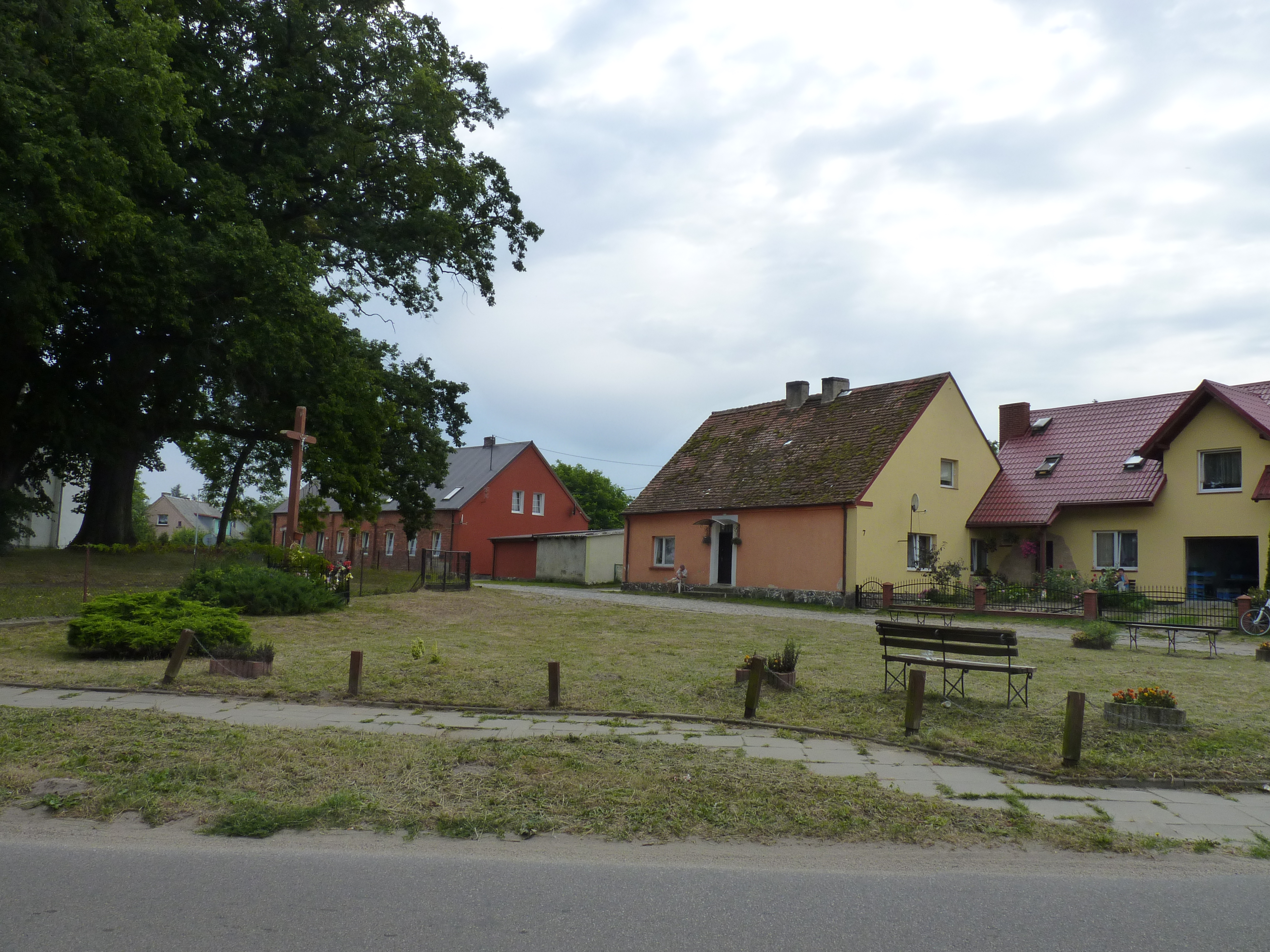
Osieki Lęborskie, looking east from the road to Choczewo
