= Kierzkowo, Wejherowo County =

Kierzkowo
- Village
- Location within Poland
- Coordinates: 54°46′0″N 17°52′19″E
- Country: Poland
- Voivodeship: Pomeranian
- County: Wejherowo
- Gmina: Choczewo
- Population: 204

Kierzkowo [kʲɛʂˈkɔvɔ] (German: Kerschkow) is a village in the administrative district of Gmina Choczewo, within Wejherowo County, Pomeranian Voivodeship, in northern Poland.

For details of the history of the region, see History of Pomerania.
