= Ciekocinko =

- Village
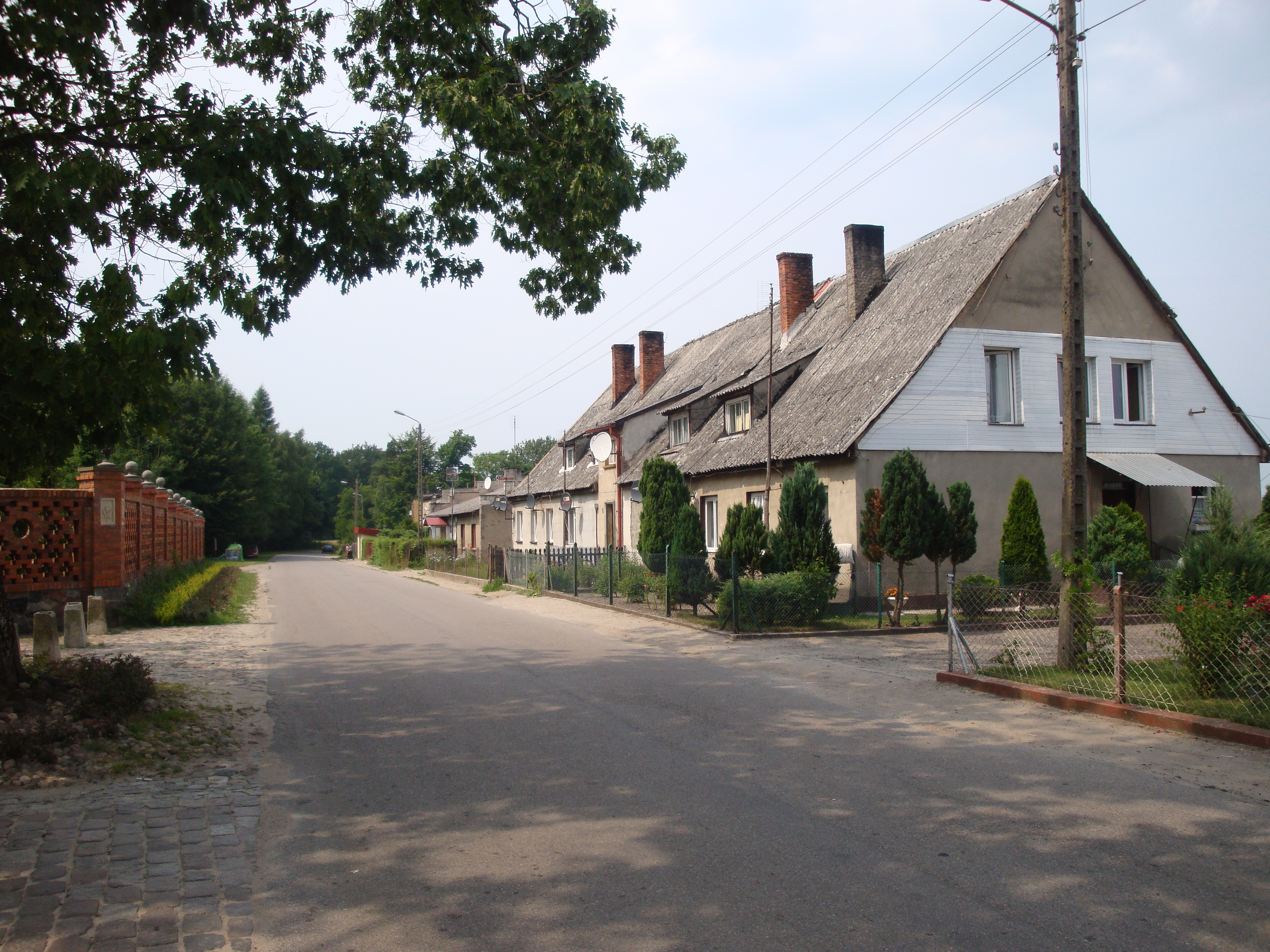

- Location within Poland
- Coordinates: 54°44′48″N 17°47′53″E
- Country: Poland
- Voivodeship: Pomeranian
- County: Wejherowo
- Gmina: Choczewo
- Population: 263

Ciekocinko [t͡ɕɛkɔˈt͡ɕinkɔ] is a village in the administrative district of Gmina Choczewo, within Wejherowo County, Pomeranian Voivodeship, in northern Poland.

For details of the history of the region, see History of Pomerania.
