= Gościęcino =

Gościęcino Lãbòrsczé Gòscëcëno (Kashubian)
- Village
- Location within Poland
- Coordinates: 54°40′17″N 17°49′18″E
- Country: Poland
- Voivodeship: Pomeranian
- County: Wejherowo
- Gmina: Choczewo
- Population: 89

Gościęcino (Polish: [ɡɔɕt͡ɕɛɲˈt͡ɕinɔ]) is a village in the administrative district of Gmina Choczewo, within Wejherowo County, Pomeranian Voivodeship, in northern Poland.

For details of the history of the region, see History of Pomerania.
