= Choczewko =

- Village
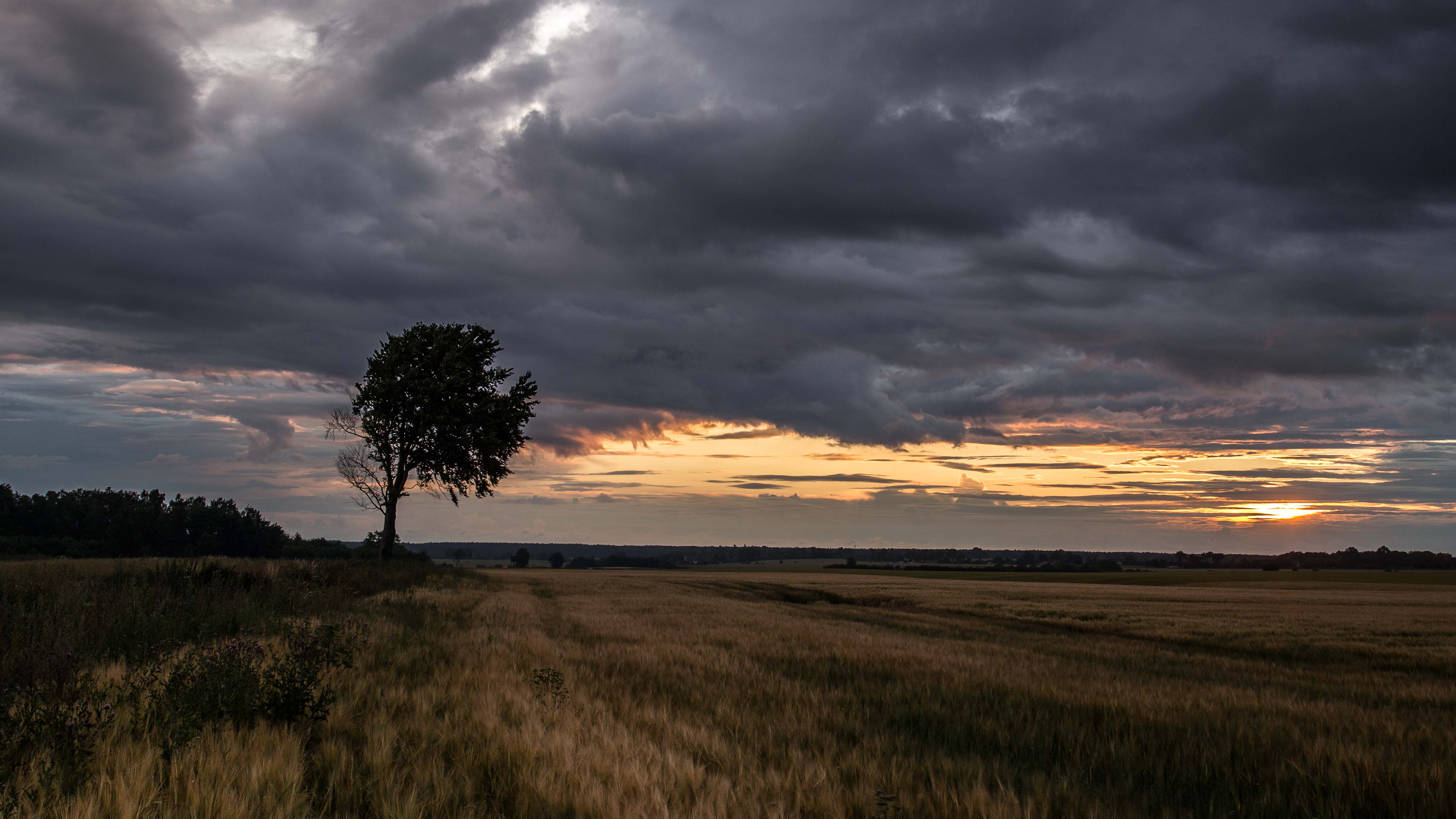

- Location within Poland
- Coordinates: 54°44′30″N 17°51′0″E
- Country: Poland
- Voivodeship: Pomeranian
- County: Wejherowo
- Gmina: Choczewo

Population
  - Total: 210
- Postal code: 84-210
- Vehicle registration: GWE

Choczewko [xɔˈt͡ʂɛfkɔ] is a village in the administrative district of Gmina Choczewo, within Wejherowo County, Pomeranian Voivodeship, in northern Poland. It is located in the historic region of Pomerania.
