= Zwartowo, Pomeranian Voivodeship =

Zwartowo
- Village
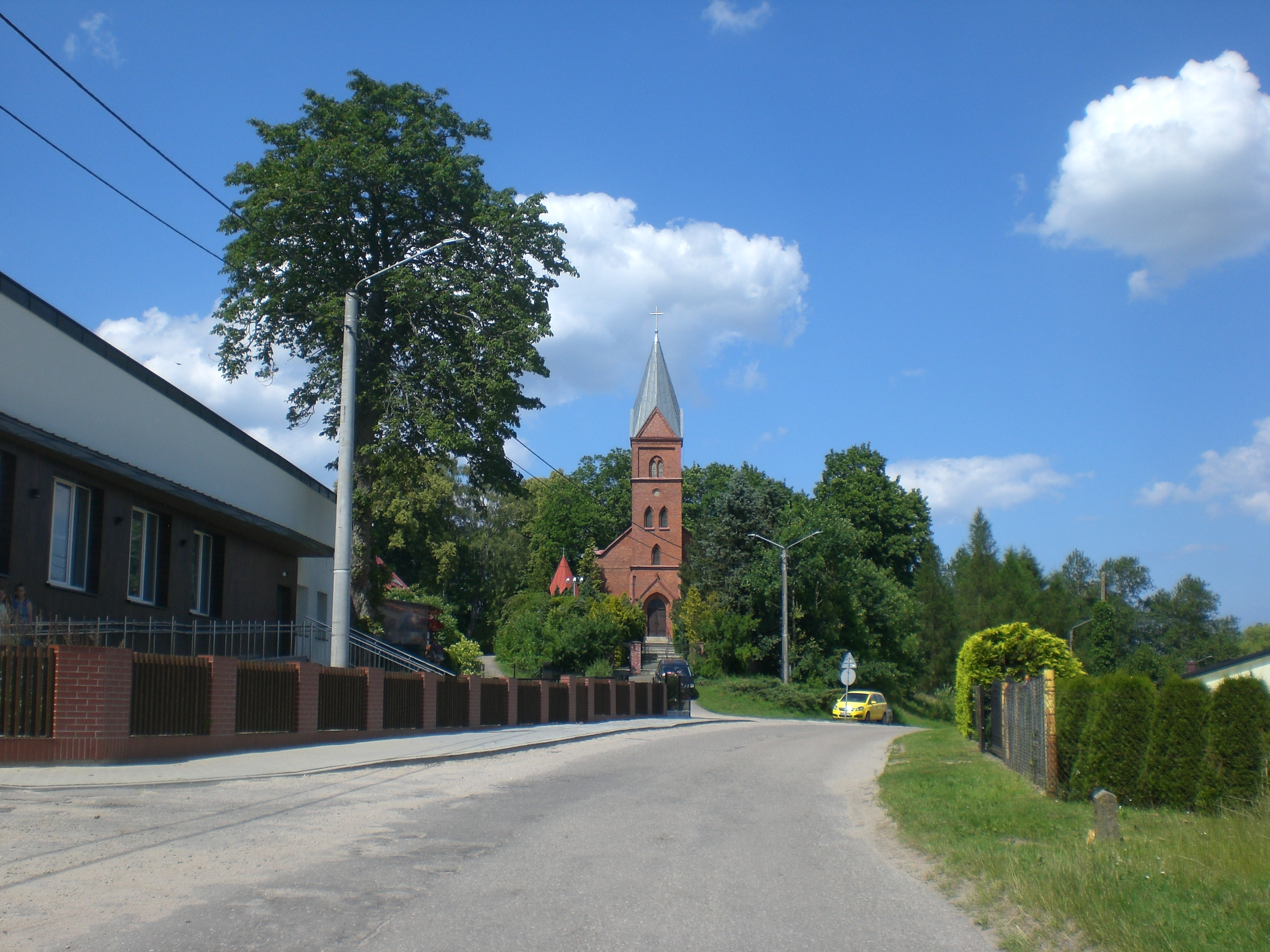

- Location within Poland
- Coordinates: 54°41′50″N 17°49′2″E
- Country: Poland
- Voivodeship: Pomeranian
- County: Wejherowo
- Gmina: Choczewo

Population
  - Total: 334
- Time zone: UTC+1 (CET)
  - Summer (DST): UTC+2 (CEST)
- Vehicle registration: GWE

Zwartowo [zvarˈtɔvɔ] is a village in the administrative district of Gmina Choczewo, within Wejherowo County, Pomeranian Voivodeship, in northern Poland.

Polish Reformed preachers lived in the village since 1677, until the main preacher moved to nearby Lębork in 1737.
