= Przebędowo Lęborskie railway station =

Railway station in Pomeranian Voivodeship, Poland

Przebędowo Lęborskie

General information
- Location: Przebędowo Lęborskie; Poland
- Coordinates: 54.726316°N 17.817553°E
- Owner: Polskie Koleje Państwowe S.A.
- Platforms: None

Construction
- Structure type: Building: No; Depot: No; Water tower: No

History
- Former names: Prebendow (Kr. Lauenburg) until 1945
Location

Przebędowo Lęborskie is a dismantled former PKP railway station on the disused PKP rail line 230 in Przebędowo Lęborskie (Pomeranian Voivodeship), Poland.

== Lines crossing the station ==
Start station	End station	Line type
Wejherowo	Garczegorze	Closed
