= Kopalino =

- Village
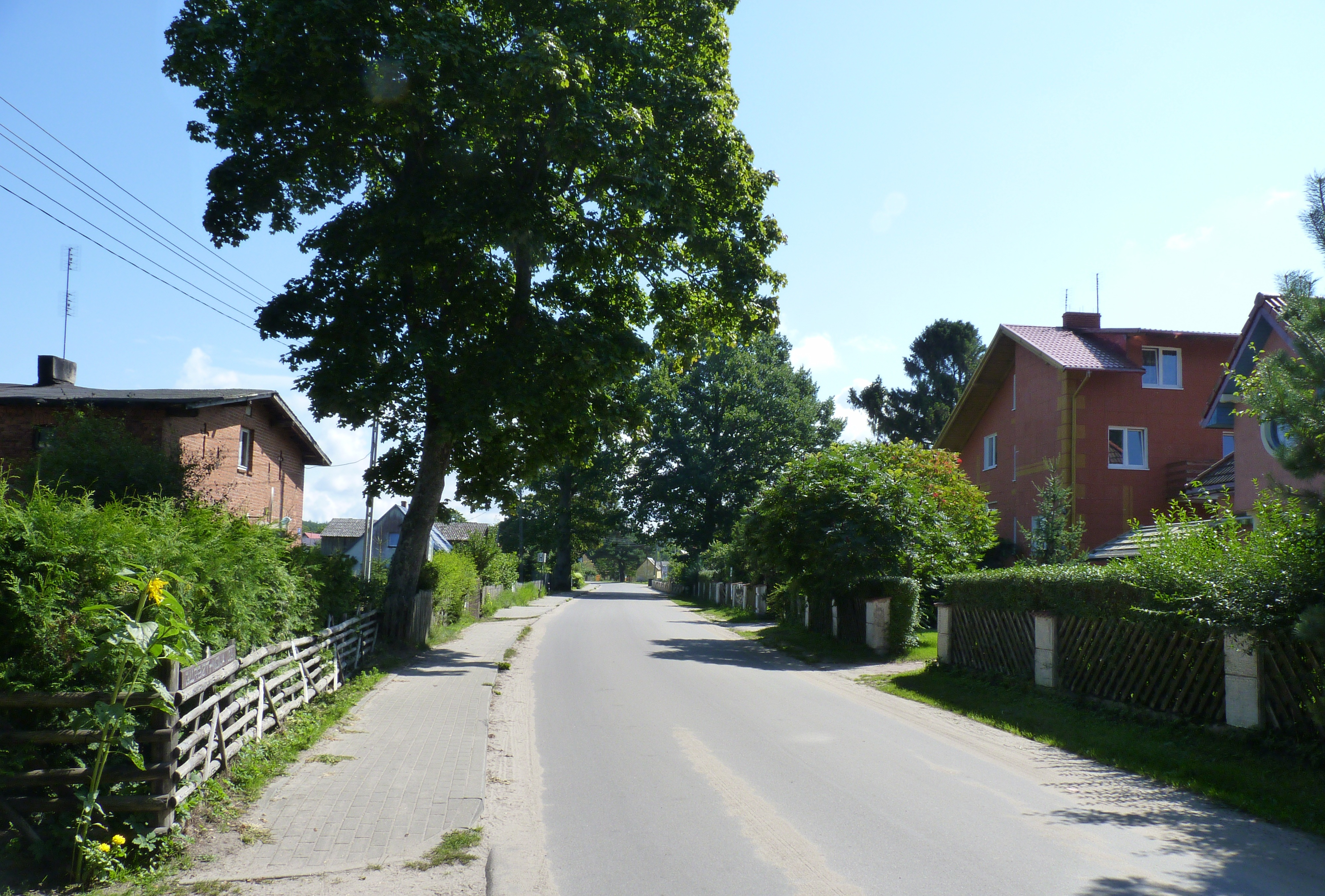
- Ulica Bursztynowa, the main street of Kopalino, facing east

- Location within Poland
- Coordinates: 54°47′22″N 17°51′4″E
- Country: Poland
- Voivodeship: Pomeranian
- County: Wejherowo
- Gmina: Choczewo
- Population: 154
- Time zone: UTC+1 (CET)
  - Summer (DST): UTC+2 (CEST)
- Vehicle registration: GWE

Kopalino [kɔpaˈlinɔ] (German: Koppalin) is a village in the administrative district of Gmina Choczewo, within Wejherowo County, Pomeranian Voivodeship, in northern Poland. It is located within the ethnocultural region of Kashubia in the historic region of Pomerania.

On 22 December 2021, Polskie Elektrownie Jądrowe announced the preferred location for Poland's first commercial nuclear power plant at a site called Lubiatowo-Kopalino just west of the village.

== Images of Kopalino ==
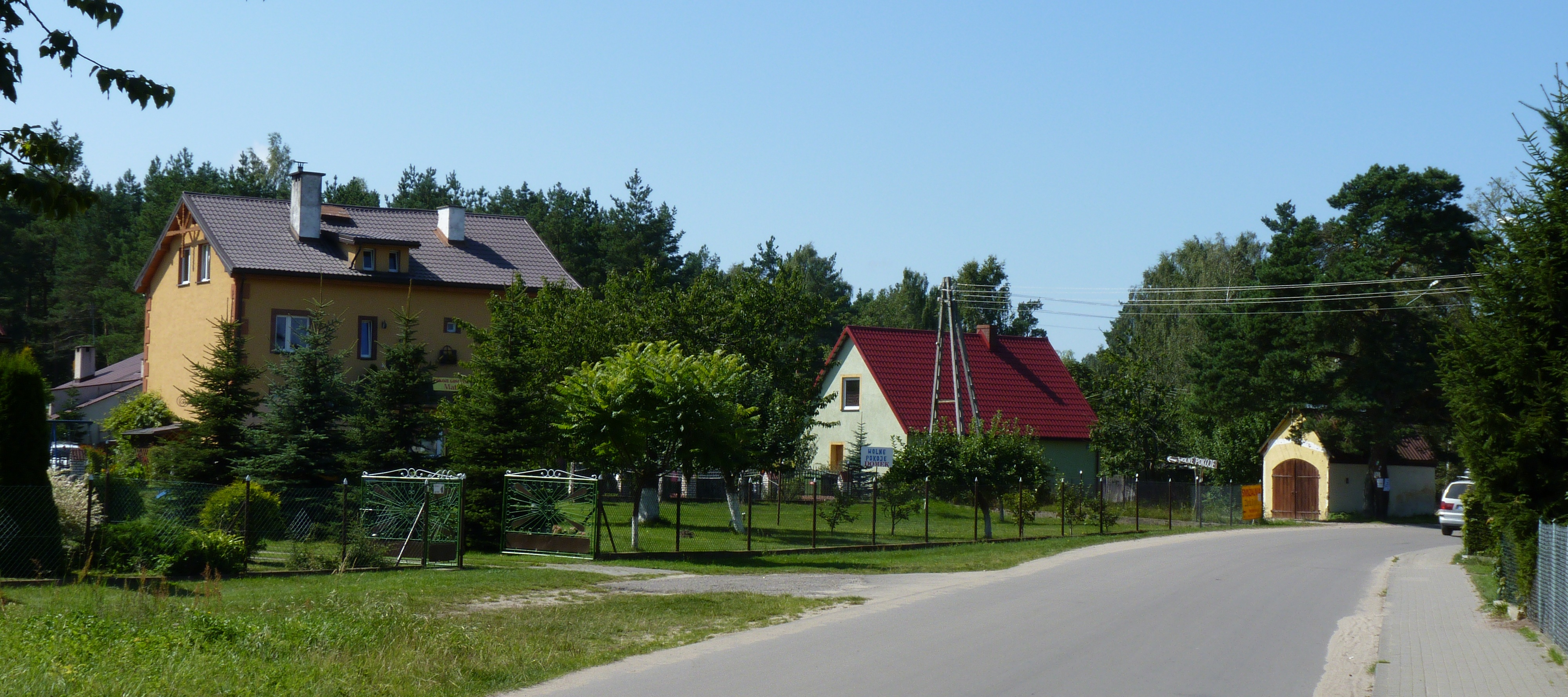
Ulica Bursztynowa, the main street of Kopalino, facing west

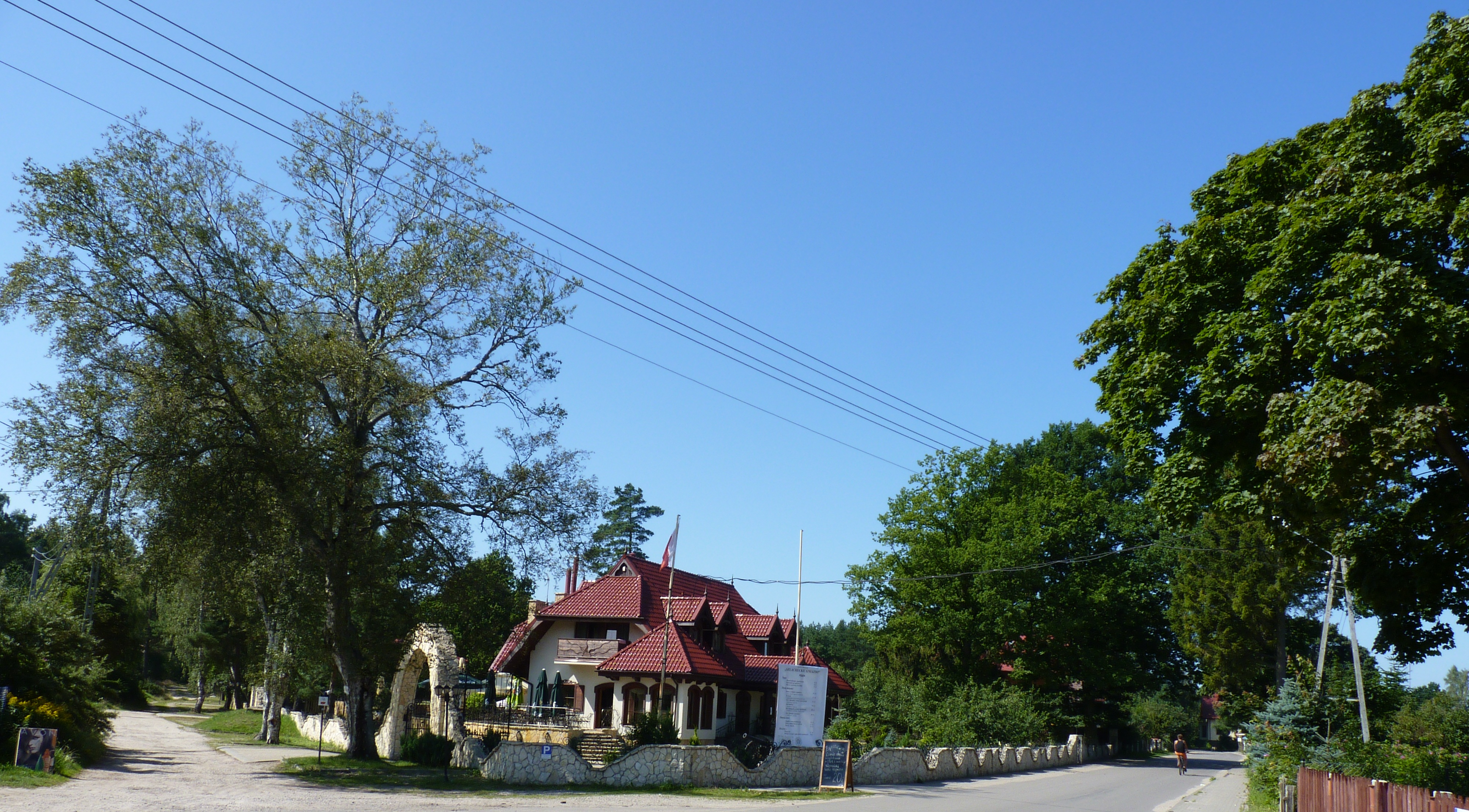
The Szlacheckie Gniazdo restaurant and hotel on Ulica Bursztynowa

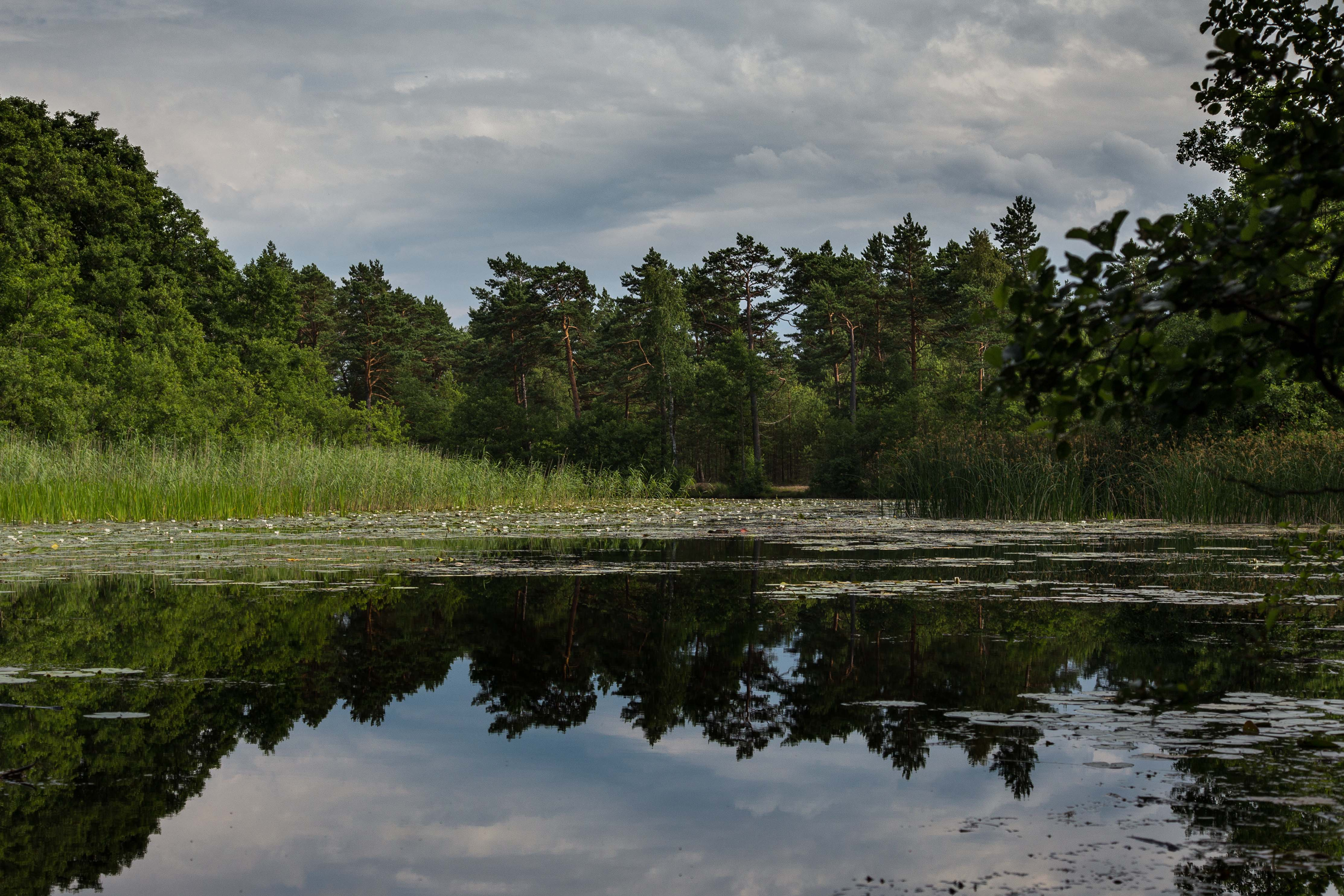
Kopalińskie Lake
