= Przebendowo, Pomeranian Voivodeship =

Przebendowo
- Village
- Location within Poland
- Coordinates: 54°43′33″N 17°50′16″E
- Country: Poland
- Voivodeship: Pomeranian
- County: Wejherowo
- Gmina: Choczewo
- Population: 61

Przebendowo [pʂɛbɛnˈdɔvɔ] (formerly called Przebędowo until December 31st, 2007), is a village in the administrative district of Gmina Choczewo, within Wejherowo County, Pomeranian Voivodeship, in northern Poland.

For details of the history of the region, see History of Pomerania.
