= Maritime County =

Former Polish subdivision

Maritime County Powiat morski
- County of the Pomeranian and Gdańsk Voivodeships
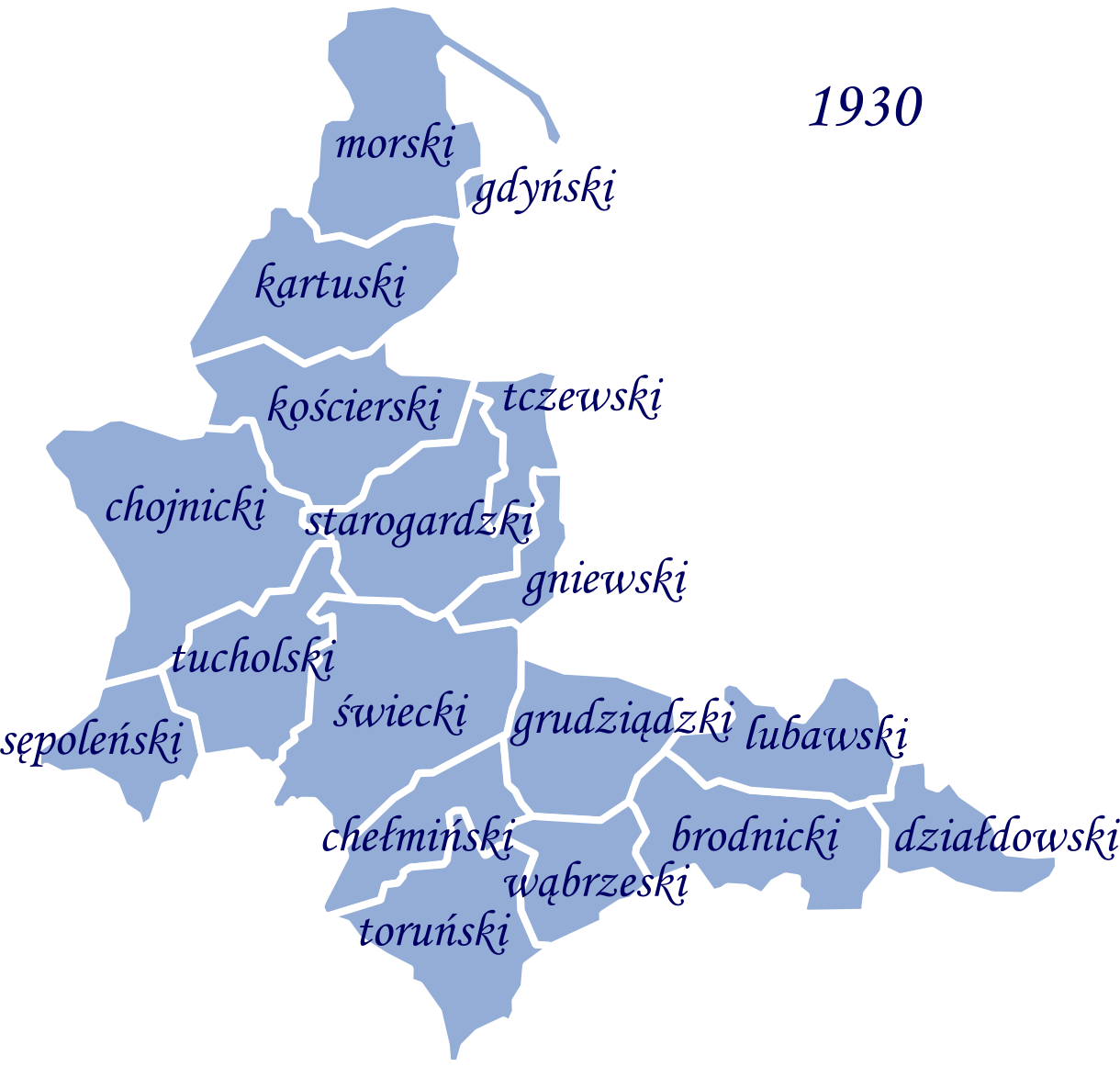
- The counties of the Pomeranian Voivodeship in 1930, including Maritime County
- Capital: Gdynia (1927–1928); Wejherowo (1928–1939; 1945–1951)
- Area
  - 1947: 1,281 km^{2} (495 sq mi)
- Population
  - 1931: 79 900
  - 1946: 85 493
  - Type: County
- Contained within
  - Country: Second Polish Republic (1927–1939); Provisional Government of the Republic of Poland (1945); Provisional Government of National Unity (1945–1947); Polish People's Republic (1947–1951)
  - Voivodeship: Pomeranian (1927–1939); Pomeranian (1945); Gdańsk (1945–1951)
Preceded by
Puck County
Wejherowo County
Maritime District
Succeeded by
Maritime District
Gdynia
Wejherowo County

The Maritime County (Note: Polish: Powiat morski) was a county centered around Gdynia and Wejherowo, that existed from 1927 to 1939 and from 1945 to 1951. From 1927 to 1939, it was located in the Pomeranian Voivodeship, in the Second Polish Republic. In 1945, it was located in the Pomeranian Voivodeship, and from 1945 to 1951, it was located in the Gdańsk Voivodeship, which, in 1945 were under the administration of the Provisional Government of the Republic of Poland, from 1945 to 1947, under the administration of the Provisional Government of National Unity, and since 1947, under the administration of the Polish People's Republic. Until 1928, its seat was located in the city of Gdynia, and was then moved to Wejherowo.

== History ==
Maritime County was established on 1 January 1927, from then-disestablished Puck County and part of Wejherowo County. Its seat was located in the city of Gdynia. It was one of the counties of the Pomeranian Voivodeship of the Second Polish Republic. Upon its creation it became the only county of Poland to border the Baltic Sea, and thus the country's only sea access.

On 21 March 1928, Wejherowo County was incorporated into Maritime County, with the exception of the gminas (municipalities) of Linia, Tłuczewo, Niepoczołowice, Zakrzewo, and Kętrzyno, that were incorporated into Kartuzy County. Additionally, the seat of the county was transferred from Gdynia to Wejherowo.

On 24 January 1929, the city of Gdynia became a separate city county. In 1931, the Maritime County was inhabited by 79,900 people.

On 15 June 1934, the municipalities of Linia, Tłuczewo, Niepoczołowice, Zakrzewo, and Kętrzyno were transferred from Kartuzy County to Maritime County. On 1 August 1934, the single-village rural municipalities were replaced by multi-village rural municipalities. As such, the county was divided into two cities, Puck and Wejherowo, and 11 municipalities.

On 1 September 1939, Nazi Germany invaded Poland, conquering area that included the county. It was then replaced by the Neustadt District, located in the Danzig Region of Reichsgau Danzig-West Prussia.

The county was reestablished in 1945, following the area being liberated by the Red Army of the Soviet Union, and given under Polish administration of the Provisional Government of the Republic of Poland. Until 7 April 1945, was located within the Pomeranian Voivodeship, when it was incorporated into then-established Gdańsk Voivodeship. On 28 June 1945 the Provisional Government of the Republic of Poland had been replaced by the Provisional Government of National Unity, and on the 19 February 1947, the provisional government was replaced by the Polish People's Republic. In 1946, the county was inhabited by 85 493 people, and in 1947, it had an area of 1281 km^{2}. It existed until 1 July 1951, when it was replaced by the Wejherowo County.
