= Danzig (disambiguation) =

Danzig is the German name (and former official appellation) of Gdańsk, a city in northern Poland.

Danzig may also refer to:

== Places ==
- Danzig (region), government region, within the Prussian Provinces 1829–1878
- Free City of Danzig, a semi-autonomous city state that existed between 1920 and 1939
- Free City of Danzig (Napoleonic), a semi-independent city state established by Napoleon in 1807
- Danzig, North Dakota, a community in the United States
- Danzig-Holm, German Nazi Stutthof concentration camp
- Reichsgau Danzig-West Prussia, administrative division of Nazi Germany created on 8 October 1939 from annexed territory of the Free City of Danzig
- Köseler village, also known as Danzig, in Tunceli Province, Turkey
- Dereboyu village, also known as Danzig, in Tunceli Province, Turkey

== Sport ==
- BuEV Danzig, Ballspiel- und Eislauf-Verein Danzig
- Gedania Danzig
  - Gedania 1922 Gdańsk
- Ostmark Danzig
- Preußen Danzig
- LSV Danzig, Lufttwaffensportverein Danzig
- Post SG Danzig, Post Sportgemeinde Danzig
- SG OrPo Danzig, Sportverein Schutzpolizei Danzig

== Other uses ==
- Danzig (band), an American heavy metal band
  - Danzig (album), a 1988 album by the band
  - Glenn Danzig, the band's lead singer and namesake
- Danzig law
- Danzig German, Northeastern German dialects
- Danzig (ship), three German naval ships
- Danzig (horse), an American racehorse
- Danzig Highflyer, a breed of fancy pigeon
- Danzig (surname)
- 1419 Danzig, an asteroid
- Danzig Trilogy, a series of novels by Günter Grass

== See also ==
- Dantzig, a surname (including a list of people with the name)
- "Danzing", original title of Ukraine's 2007 Eurovision Song Contest entry
- Gdańsk (disambiguation)
