= Gdańsk (disambiguation) =

Gdańsk is a city in northern Poland.

Gdańsk may also refer to several places:

- Gdańsk Bay, the bay in the Baltic Sea adjoining the port of Gdańsk and stretching to Kaliningrad
- Gdańsk County, a small administrative area next to but not including the city of Gdańsk
- Gdańsk Pomerania, a region of Pomerania more commonly called "Eastern Pomerania"
- Gdańsk Voivodeship (disambiguation)
  - Gdańsk Voivodeship (1945–1975)
  - Gdańsk Voivodeship (1975–1998)
- Gdańsk (parliamentary constituency), a parliamentary constituency in Poland
- Lechia Gdańsk, a football club based in Gdańsk

== See also ==
- Danzig (disambiguation)
