= List of griffins as mascots and in heraldry =

The Griffin (or Gryphon) is a legendary creature with the body of a lion and the head and wings of an eagle. Combining the attributes of the "King of the Beasts" and the "King of the Air", it was thought to be especially powerful and majestic. Griffins appear widely as school sports team mascots, in heraldry and in corporate logos.

== National symbols ==
The greater state arms of Latvia, with a griffin on the shield and a griffin as supporter

The coat of arms of Latvia has a griffin on the shield and a griffin as a supporter. The griffin on the shield is holding a sword and is the symbol of Vidzeme and Latgale (Eastern Latvia), one of the historical territories making up modern day Latvia. The coat of arms of Lithuania also features a white griffin as a supporter. Historically, the coat of arms of Austria-Hungary featured a black-gold griffin as a supporter.

== Subdivisional and municipal coats of arms ==
Pomeranian heraldic griffin

Some municipalities have griffins derived from state or county arms, e.g. many towns in the ancient province of Pomerania in Germany (Mecklenburg-Vorpommern) and Poland (Pomeranian Voivodeship and West Pomeranian Voivodeship) have the Pomeranian griffin in their arms.

=== Subdivisions ===
Image	Subdivision	Type	Country	Notes
	Antwerp	province	Belgium (Flemish Region)	
	Adaincourt	commune	France (Grand Est)	
	Ahlbeck	town	Germany (Mecklenburg–Western Pomerania)	
	Ainaži	town	Latvia (Limbaži Municipality)	Including coat of arms of Vidzeme at sinister side
	Anklam	town	Germany (Mecklenburg–Western Pomerania)	
	Altentreptow	town	Germany (Mecklenburg–Western Pomerania)	
	Baden-Württemberg	state	Germany	Coat of arms of Baden-Württemberg
	Balzers	municipality	Liechtenstein	
	Gmina Banie	gmina	Poland (West Pomeranian Voivodeship)	
	Bentwisch	municipality	Germany (Mecklenburg–Western Pomerania)	
	Białogard	town	Poland (West Pomeranian Voivodeship)	Coat of arms of Białogard
	Białogard County	county	Poland (West Pomeranian Voivodeship)	
	Bodilis	commune	France (Brittany)	
	Broderstorf	municipality	Germany (Mecklenburg–Western Pomerania)	
	Brzesko	town	Poland (Lesser Poland Voivodeship)	
	Brusy	town	Poland (Pomeranian Voivodeship)	
	Budapest	municipality	Hungary	Coat of arms of Budapest
	Camden	borough	United Kingdom (Greater London, England)	Coat of arms of the London Borough of Camden
	Civrieux-d'Azergues	commune	France (Auvergne-Rhône-Alpes)	
	Autonomous Republic of Crimea	autonomous republic	Ukraine	Coat of arms of Crimea
	Republic of Crimea	republic	Russia	Coat of arms of Crimea
	Dębica	town	Poland (Subcarpathian Voivodeship)	
	Dębica County	county	Poland (Subcarpathian Voivodeship)	
	Demmin	town	Germany (Mecklenburg–Western Pomerania)	
	Dobra	town	Poland (West Pomeranian Voivodeship)	
	Furdenheim	commune	France (Grand Est)	
	Genoa	city	Italy (Liguria)	
	Golczewo	town	Poland (West Pomeranian Voivodeship)	
	Grabowo	municipal neighbourhood	Poland (West Pomeranian Voivodeship)	
	Gréasque	commune	France (Provence-Alpes-Côte d'Azur)	
	Greifensee	municipality	Switzerland (Canton of Zürich)	
	Greifswald	city	Germany (Mecklenburg–Western Pomerania)	
	Hammersmith and Fulham	borough	United Kingdom (Greater London, England)	Coat of arms of the London Borough of Hammersmith and Fulham
	Hounslow	borough	United Kingdom (Greater London, England)	
	Izmaylovo District	district	Russia (Moscow)	
	Jarmen	town	Germany (Mecklenburg–Western Pomerania)	
	Jaunjelgava	town	Latvia (Aizkraukle Municipality)	
	Gmina Kołbaskowo	gmina	Poland (West Pomeranian Voivodeship)	
	Malmö	city	Sweden (Scania)	
	Mecklenburg–Western Pomerania	state	Germany	Coat of arms of Mecklenburg-Vorpommern
	Monoblet	commune	France (Occitania)	
	Moussy	commune	France (Île-de-France)	
	Niévroz	commune	France (Auvergne-Rhône-Alpes)	
	Östergötland	province	Sweden	
	Pomeranian Voivodeship	voivodeship	Poland	Coat of arms of the Pomeranian Voivodeship
	Richmond upon Thames	borough	United Kingdom (Greater London, England)	
	Rēzekne	city	Latvia	
	Scania	province	Sweden	
	Södermanland	province	Sweden	
	Subcarpathian Voivodeship	voivodeship	Poland	Coat of arms of the Subcarpathian Voivodeship
	Świdnica	town	Poland (Lower Silesian Voivodeship)	
	Gmina Świdnica	gmina	Poland (Lower Silesian Voivodeship)	
	Gmina Świerzno	gmina	Poland (West Pomeranian Voivodeship)	
	Szczecin	city	Poland (West Pomeranian Voivodeship)	Coat of arms of Szczecin
	Troms og Finnmark	county	Norway	
	West Pomeranian Voivodeship	voivodeship	Poland	Coat of arms of the West Pomeranian Voivodeship

=== Historical ===
Image	Subdivision	Type	Years	Country	Notes
	Bad Doberan	district	1995–2011	Germany (Mecklenburg–Western Pomerania)	
	Banie	village	until 2003	Poland (West Pomeranian Voivodeship)	
	Belz Voivodeship	voivodeship	1462–1772	Kingdom of Poland	
	Bjarkøy	municipality	1986–2013	Norway	
	Gdańsk Voivodeship	voivodeship	1975–1998	Polish People's Republic; Polish Third Republic	Coat of arms of the Pomeranian Voivodeship
	Jaunjelgava Municipality	municipality	2009–2021	Latvia	
	Pomeranian Voivodeship	voivodeship	1466–1772	Kingdom of Poland	Coat of arms of the Pomeranian Voivodeship
	Troms	county	1960–2020	Norway	

== Schools and universities ==
- Northeast Magnet High School in Bel Aire, Kansas, a suburb of Wichita, Kansas
- The Beacon Academy in Biñan, Philippines.
- The Cambridge School of Weston in Weston, Massachusetts.
- Canisius University in Buffalo, New York.
- Chestnut Hill College in Philadelphia, Pennsylvania.
- College of William & Mary in Williamsburg, Virginia.
- Downing College, Cambridge in Cambridge, England.
- Fontbonne University in Clayton, Missouri
- Fairfield Central High School in Winnsboro, South Carolina
- Gale Ranch Middle School in San Ramon, California
- Glendale Preparatory Academy in Peoria, Arizona
- Golden Gate University in San Francisco, California.
- Grossmont Community College in El Cajon, California.
- Gwynedd Mercy University in Gwynedd Valley, Pennsylvania.
- Harvard Medical School in Boston, Massachusetts.
- International School of Indiana in Indianapolis, Indiana.
- Jamaica College in Kingston, Jamaica.
- Johnson & Wales University
- Marymount Manhattan College in New York City.
- Missouri Western State University in St. Joseph, Missouri.
- Purdue University in West Lafayette, Indiana.
- Redwood Middle School in Saratoga, California.
- Reed College in Portland, Oregon.
- Rocky Mount High School in Rocky Mount, North Carolina.
- Sarah Lawrence College in Yonkers, New York.
- Seton Hill University in Greensburg, Pennsylvania.
- Trinity College, Oxford in Oxford, England.
- Westminster University in Salt Lake City, Utah.
- Buchtel High School in Akron, Ohio.
- Dutchtown High School in Geismar, Louisiana.
- Eric Hamber Secondary School in Vancouver, British Columbia.
- Lincoln-Way East High School in Frankfort, Illinois.
- Los Alamitos High School in Los Alamitos, California.
- Pomfret School in Pomfret, Connecticut.
- Winnetonka High School in Kansas City, Missouri.
- St. John Vianney High School in Kirkwood, Missouri.
- Springville-Griffith Institute in Springville, New York
- Spartanburg Day School in Spartanburg, SC
- Abingdon School in Abingdon, Oxfordshire.
- Raffles Institution in Singapore
- University of Guelph in Guelph, Ontario
- MacEwan University in Edmonton
- Father McGivney Catholic High School in Glen Carbon, Illinois
- San Juan College High School in Farmington, New Mexico
- Vrije Universiteit Amsterdam in Amsterdam, Netherlands
- Diller-Odell Public Schools in Odell, Nebraska
- The Gryphon School in Sherborne, Dorset

== Sports and Athletics ==
- The former home ground of English football team Brentford F.C. was called Griffin Park because of the griffin that features in the logo of Fuller's Brewery, which had previously owned the land. A local pub next to the ground is also named The Griffin.
- Grand Rapids Griffins, a team in the American Hockey League.
- Guelph Gryphons; the University of Guelph, Guelph, Ontario, Canada.
- London Griffins; a rugby league club.
- Waterloo Rugby Club 's badge features a griffin in the centre of a red Lancastrian Rose.
- Genoa CFC; a professional Italian football and cricket club based in the city of Genoa.
- T.S.V. Gascogne; a fencing club based in the city of Enschede
- Pogoń Szczecin; a Polish football club that has a griffin as its mascot

== Other uses ==
- Busch Gardens Williamsburg in Williamsburg, Virginia has announced their new roller coaster for 2007 will be The Griffon, designed by Swiss manufacturer Bolliger & Mabillard.
- Midland Bank used a griffin as its symbol before it was subsumed into its HSBC parent company.
- Norwegian Army 2nd Battalion has a griffin insignia
- The Philadelphia Museum of Art uses a griffin as its symbol and logo
- The United States Army's 470th Military Intelligence Brigade uses a griffin head superimposed on a basic rendering of the Panama Canal in the MI colors as its shoulder sleeve insignia
- The Lithuanian State Security Department used a griffin on its coat of arms, which holding a banner with the inspection "Patria et veritas" (Homeland and Truth).
- The Saab auto company features a profiled griffin head in its logo. Saab Aerospace built a fighter jet, the JAS 39 Gripen, meaning "griffin" in Swedish.
- Scania, a Swedish truck and bus manufacturer, uses the griffin as its trademark.
- Sprecher Brewery features a heraldic black griffin in its logo. A cartoon griffin named Rooty appears on bottles of Sprecher Root Beer.
- Vauxhall Motors of Luton, England, uses the griffin as its trademark.
- The 367th Training Support Squadron unit patch is a Griffin holding a Globe and Torch.
- Merv Griffin Entertainment used a griffin as its mascot & logo in its heyday.
- The Chartered Institute of Procurement and Supply (HQ Stamford, UK) uses griffins in its coat of arms to signify protection (of money/valuables)
- Stoewer, a defunct auto manufacturer used griffin as its logo
