= Bolesław Formela =

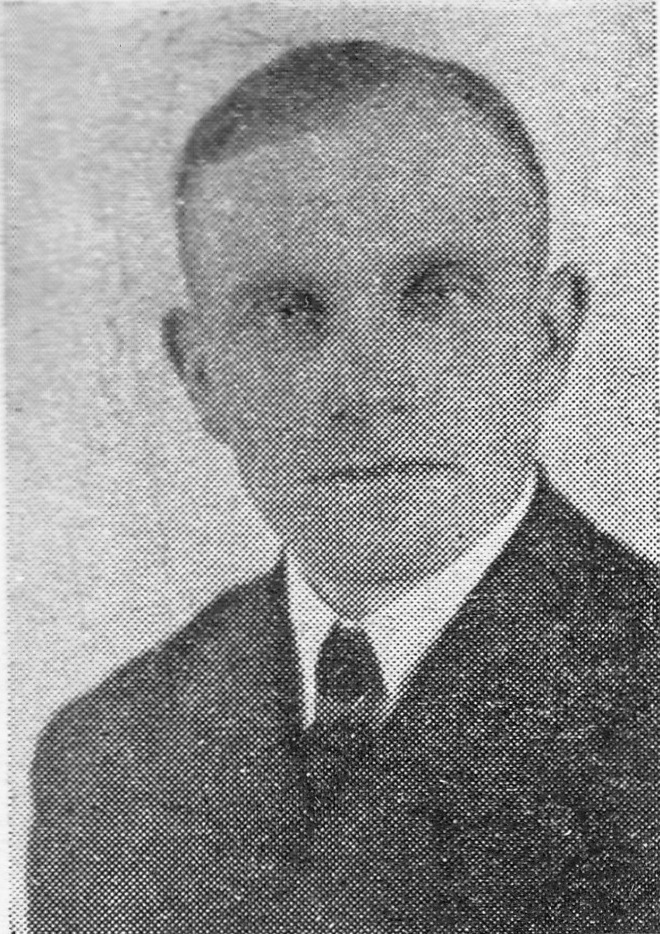
Formela Bolesław

Bolesław Formela (wartime code name, "Romiński") (born 1 November 1903, Miłoszewo, died 24 September 1944, Tłuczewo) was an officer of the Polish Army in the rank of Lieutenant (Porucznik), a Kashubian social activist, a deputy to the Sejm (1935–1938), Commander-in-chief of the "Pomeranian Griffin", a Polish-Kashubian secret military organization from 7 July 1941 to April 1942.

== Early life, military, and political career ==
Son of Jan Formela and Apolonia Cierocka. He went to primary school in Miłoszewo and later to a public classical gymnasium (high school) in Wejherowo, where he took his Matura exam on 8 June 1923.

On 7 October 1924, he was assigned to serve in the 15th Field Artillery Regiment. On 14 October 1925, he entered the military academy in Grudziądz, graduating on 15 April 1926. He was promoted to the rank of Podporucznik (second Lieutenant) of the Reserves on 1 January 1929. He was a member of multiple Kashubian social organisations. In 1933, he was elected Sołtys and in 1934 Wójt (both are equivalents of mayor for a small village) in Strzepcz. He was one of the organisers of Kashubian Rural Cooperatives.

He was a deputy to the Polish Sejm from Gdynia, from 1935 to 1938. He resumed active military service on 25 August 1939, and fought in the 1939 Invasion of Poland, mainly in the Siege of Modlin, after which he was promoted to the rank of Lieutenant (Porucznik). After the capture of Modlin on 29 September, he was captured by the Germans and held in a prison camp in Mołodeczno, near Vilnius. After a month, the prisoners were placed in a train at the local train station, from where he escaped, after learning that they were to be sent to Siberia. He went back to Pomerania, to Tłuczewo, where he was arrested in Wejherowo. With the help of his family, he escaped and went into hiding.

== Polish Resistance ==
In late 1939/ early 1940 he organised an intelligence-sabotage conspiracy group in the rural areas near Gdynia, with which he contacted the Secret Military Organisation "Kashubian Griffin". On 7 July 1941, he was chosen Commander-in-Chief of the new organisation, the "Pomeranian Griffin" at a meeting in Czarna Dąbrowa. In April 1942, he resigned from that office, due to his tuberculosis, and Juliusz Koszałka was chosen to be his successor.

He returned to his mother’s house in Tłuczewo, and died there from a heart attack on 24 September 1944. His body was buried in the family garden, and reburied with a full Catholic ceremony on 24 September 1945.
