= Linia Zakrzewo railway station =

Railway station in Pomeranian Voivodeship, Poland

Linia Zakrzewo

General information
- Location: Linia; Poland
- Owner: Polskie Koleje Państwowe S.A.
- Platforms: 1

Construction
- Structure type: Building: Yes (no longer used); Depot: Yes (no longer used); Water tower: Never existed

History
- Opened: 1905
- Former names: Linde (Kr. Neustadt); 1939–1945; Linia Zakrzewko until 1939
Location

Linia Zakrzewo is a non-operational PKP railway station in Linia (Pomeranian Voivodeship), Poland. Rail services to the station ceased in June 2000 after 95 years of operation.

== Lines crossing the station ==
Start station	End station	Line type
Pruszcz Gdański	Łeba	Dismantled
