= Niedźwiadek, Pomeranian Voivodeship =

Niedźwiadek
- Village
- Location within Poland
- Coordinates: 54°28′51″N 18°5′17″E
- Country: Poland
- Voivodeship: Pomeranian
- County: Wejherowo
- Gmina: Linia
- Village: Pobłocie

Niedźwiadek (Note: Polish pronunciation: [ɲɛd͡ʑˈvjadɛk]; Kashubian: Miedwiedzôk) is a part of a village of Pobłocie in Pomeranian Voivodeship, Poland, located in Gmina Linia, Wejherowo County.
