= Luigi Bossi Visconti =

Italian archivist, librarian, and writer (1758–1835)

Luigi Bossi Visconti (25 February 1758, in Milan – 10 April 1835, in Milan) was an Italian archivist, librarian, writer, translator, and politician. He is best remembered for his translation of William Roscoe biography of Pope Leo X, and for serving as a deputy in the Cisalpine Republic, an ambassador in the Ligurian Republic, and a count in the Napoleonic Kingdom of Italy. He was invested with the Order of the Iron Crown of Austria.
