= Formela =

Formela is a surname occurring in Poland. Notable people with the surname include:

- Bolesław Formela (1903–1944), Polish Army officer and politician
- Mirosław Formela (1978–2025), Polish middle distance runner
