= Gdańsk Voivodeship =

The name Gdańsk Voivodeship has been used twice to designate local governments in Poland:

- Gdańsk Voivodeship (1945–1975)
- Gdańsk Voivodeship (1975–1998)
