= Kętrzyno railway station =

Railway station in Poland

Kętrzyno
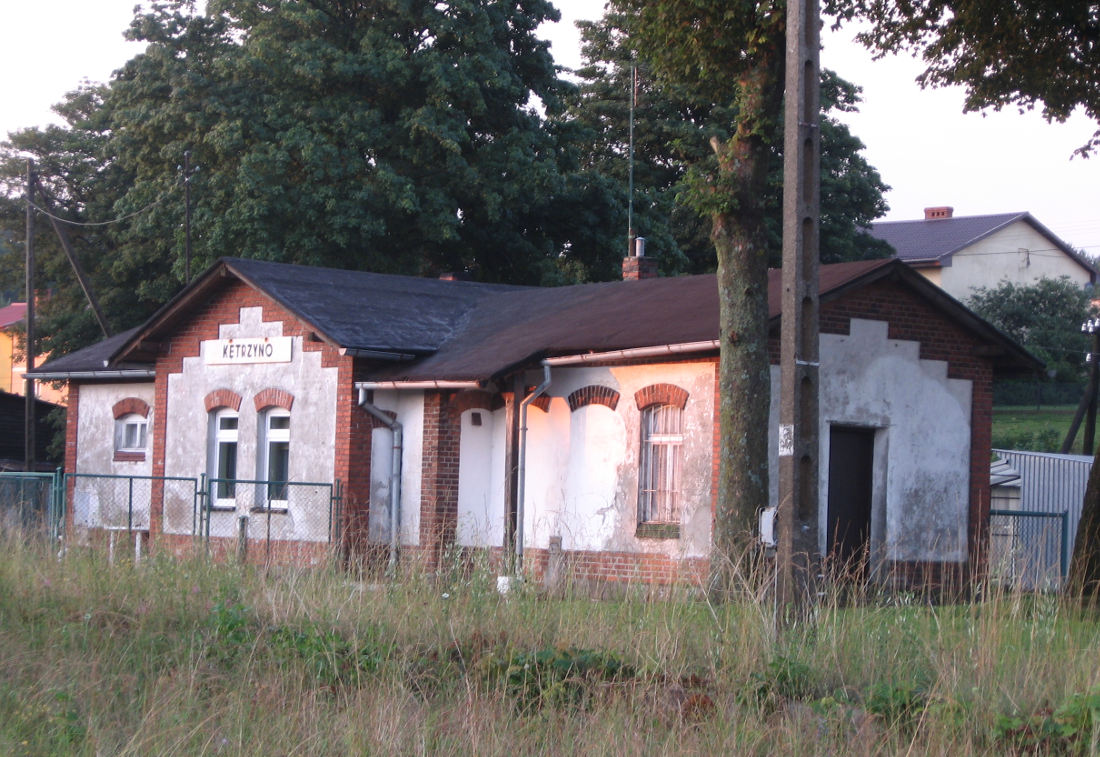

General information
- Location: Kętrzyno; Poland
- Coordinates: 54.496205°N 17.940348°E
- Owner: Polskie Koleje Państwowe S.A.

History
- Former names: Kontenau until 1945
Location

Kętrzyno is a non-operational PKP railway station in Kętrzyno (Pomeranian Voivodeship), Poland.
