= Dantzig =

Dantzig is a surname. Notable people with the surname include:

- Tobias Dantzig (1884–1956), mathematician from Lithuania, father of George Dantzig
- George Dantzig (1914–2005), American mathematician who introduced the simplex algorithm
- David van Dantzig (1900–1959), Dutch mathematician
- Rudi van Dantzig (1933–2012), Dutch choreographer, ballet dancer and writer
- Jol Dantzig, American guitar player and designer, founder of Hamer Guitar company

== See also ==
- Danzig (disambiguation)
- Danzig (surname)
- Danziger
