= Niepoczołowice railway station =

Railway station in Niepoczołowice, Poland

Niepoczołowice

General information
- Location: Niepoczołowice; Poland
- Coordinates: 54.435901°N 17.879345°E
- Owner: Polskie Koleje Państwowe S.A.

Construction
- Structure type: Building: Yes (no longer used); Depot: Never existed Water tower: Never existed

History
- Former names: Wahlendorf until 1945
Location

Niepoczołowice is a non-operational PKP railway station in Niepoczołowice (Pomeranian Voivodeship), Poland.

== Lines crossing the station ==
Start station	End station	Line type
Pruszcz Gdański	Łeba	Dismantled
