= Pomeranian Voivodeship (1919–1939) =

Former voivodeship of Poland

Coordinates: 53°00′41″N 18°36′25″E

Pomeranian Voivodeship Województwo Pomorskie
- Voivodeship of Poland
- 1919–1939
- Coat of arms

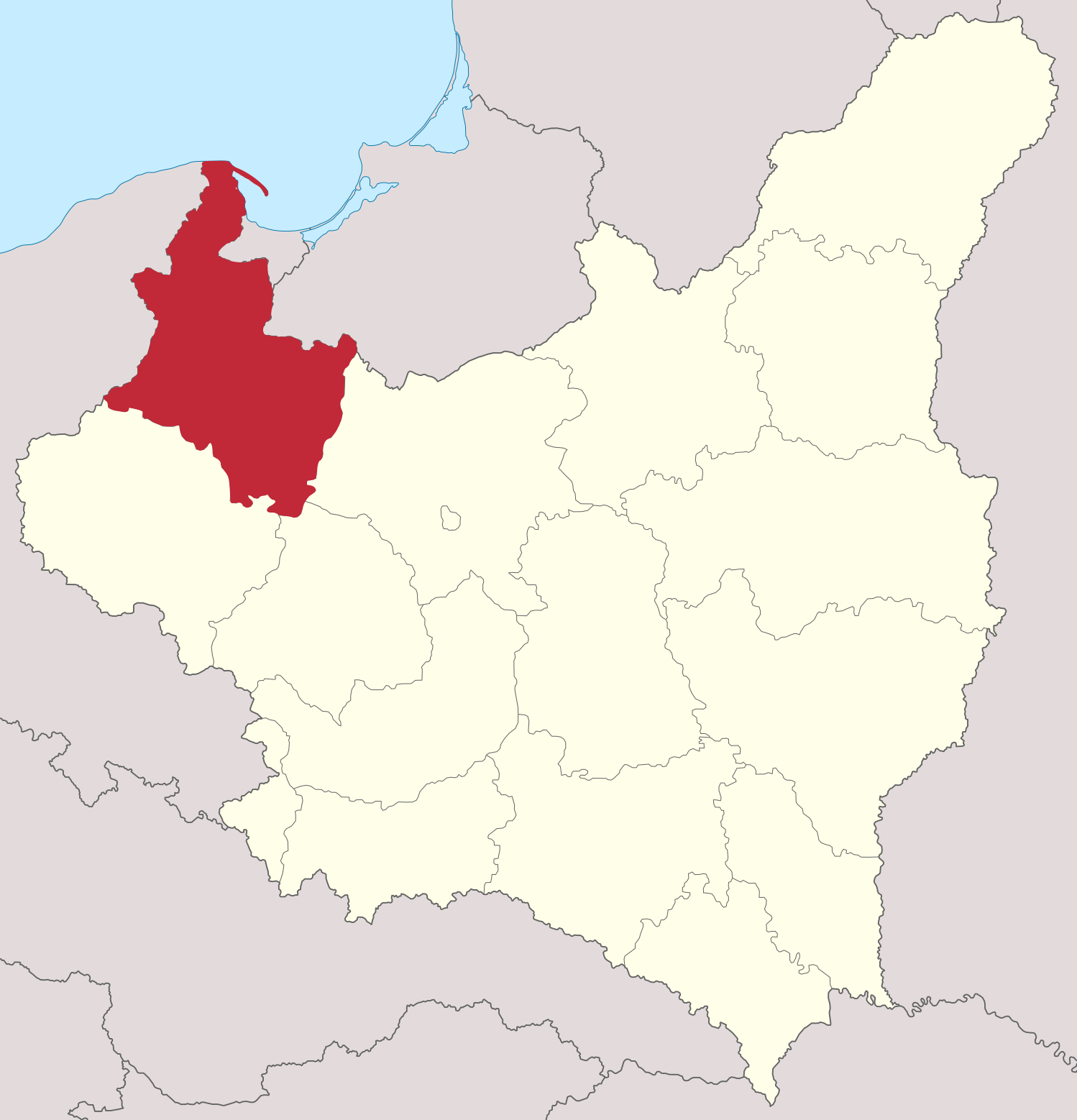
- Location of the Pomeranian Voivodeship (so-called "Greater Pomerania") (red) within the Second Polish Republic (1938).
- Capital: Toruń
- Area
  - 1921: 16,386 km^{2} (6,327 sq mi)
  - 1939: 28,402 km^{2} (10,966 sq mi)
- Population
  - 1921: 935,643
  - 1931: 1,080,138
- Government
  - Type: Voivodeship
- Voivodes
  - 1919–1920: Stefan Łaszewski
  - 1936–1939: Władysław Raczkiewicz
- Historical era: Interwar period
  - Established: 12 August 1919
  - Territorial changes: 1 April 1938
  - Annexed by Germany: September 1939
- Political subdivisions: 28 powiats
Preceded by	Succeeded by
West Prussia	Reichsgau Danzig-West Prussia
- Today part of: Poland

The Pomeranian Voivodeship or Pomorskie Voivodeship (Polish: Województwo Pomorskie) was an administrative unit of the Second Polish Republic. It ceased to function in September 1939, following the German and Soviet invasion of Poland.

Most of the territory of Pomeranian province became part of the current Kuyavian-Pomeranian Voivodeship, of which one of two capitals is the same as the interwar voivodeship's Toruń; the second one is Bydgoszcz.

The name Pomerania derives from the Slavic po more, meaning "by the sea" or "on the sea".

== History ==
This was a unit of administration and local government in the Republic of Poland (II Rzeczpospolita) established in 1919 after World War I from the majority of the Prussian province of West Prussia (made out of territories taken in Partitions of Poland which was returned to Poland. Toruń was the capital. In 1938–1939, the voivodeship extended to the south at the expense of Poznań Voivodeship and Warsaw Voivodeship, and was called Great Pomerania afterwards (see: Territorial changes of Polish Voivodeships on April 1, 1938).

During World War II, it was occupied by Nazi Germany and unilaterally annexed as Reichsgau Danzig-Westpreußen ("Reich province of Danzig-West Prussia"). Poles and Jews were classified as untermenschen by German authorities and their intended fate slavery and extermination. In 1945, the region was returned to Poland. In 1945 out of its northern territory, the new voivodeship of Gdańsk was formed, including annexed territories of the Free City of Danzig and of German Prussian Province of Pomerania and German Prussian Province of East Prussia. The bulk of the old voivodeship was enlarged by annexed territories of the German Prussian Province of Pomerania and later renamed into Bydgoszcz voivodeship. In the years 1975–1998, it was reorganized into the voivodeships of Gdańsk, Elbląg, Bydgoszcz, Toruń, and Włocławek.

== Area and counties ==
Between April 1, 1938 and September 1, 1939, the Voivodeship's area was 25 683 km^{2}, and its population - 1 884 400 (according to the 1931 census). It consisted of 28 powiats (counties), 64 cities, and 234 villages. Railroad density was high, with 11.4 km. per 100 km^{2} (total length of railroads within the Voivodeship's area was 1 887 km., second in the whole country). Forests covered 26.7% of the voivodeship, which was higher than the national average (in 1937, the average was 22.2%).

Pomorskie Voivodeship was one of the richest and best developed in interwar Poland. With numerous cities and well-developed rail, it also provided the country with access to the Baltic Sea in what is called the Polish Corridor. Only 8.3% of population was illiterate, which was much lower than the national average of 23.1% (as for 1931). Poles made up majority of population (88%). After World War I, the number of Germans was 117,251 in 1926 and 107,555 in 1934. As of 1931, 9.8% of the populace were ethnic Germans and 0.3% Jews.

This is the list of the Pomorskie Voivodeship counties as of August 31, 1939:

Administrative division of the Voivodeship in 1938.

- Brodnica county (area 913 km^{2}, pop. 56 300),
- city of Bydgoszcz county (area 75 km^{2}, pop. 117 200),
- Bydgoszcz county (area 1 334 km^{2}, pop. 58 100),
- Chełmno county (area 738 km^{2}, pop. 52 800),
- Chojnice county (area 1 854 km^{2}, pop. 76 900),
- city of Gdynia county (area 66 km^{2}, pop. 38 600),
- city of Grudziądz county (area 28 km^{2}, pop. 54 000),
- Grudziądz county (area 758 km^{2}, pop. 42 800),
- city of Inowrocław county (area 37 km^{2}, pop. 34 400),
- Inowrocław county (area 1 267 km^{2}, pop. 67 500),
- Kartuzy county (area 1 302 km^{2}, pop. 68 700),
- Kościerzyna county (area 1 162 km^{2}, pop. 51 700),
- Lipno county (area 1 535 km^{2}, pop. 104 500),
- Lubawa county (area 833 km^{2}, pop. 53 600),
- Nieszawa county (area 1 278 km^{2}, pop. 117 900),
- Rypin county (area 1 188 km^{2}, pop. 84 900),
- Sępólno Krajeńskie county (area 681 km^{2}, pop. 31 600),
- Starogard county (area 1 127 km^{2}, pop. 71 800),
- Szubin county (area 917 km^{2}, pop. 47 800),
- Świecie county (area 1 533 km^{2}, pop. 88 000),
- Tczew county (area 716 km^{2}, pop. 67 400),
- city of Toruń county (area 59 km^{2}, pop. 61 900),
- Toruń county (area 864 km^{2}, pop. 52 300),
- Tuchola county (area 1 039 km^{2}, pop. 41 200),
- Maritime County (area 673 km^{2}, pop. 49 900),
- Wejherowo county (area 1 281 km^{2}, pop. 79 900),
- Włocławek county (area 1 325 km^{2}, pop. 147 800),
- Wyrzysk county (area 1 101 km^{2}, pop. 64 900).

== Main cities ==
Biggest cities of the Voivodeship were (data according to the 1931 Polish census):

- Bydgoszcz (pop. 117 200) - since 1938
- Toruń (pop. 61 900) - the capital
- Włocławek (pop. 56 000) - since 1938
- Grudziądz (pop. 54 000)
- Gdynia (pop. 38 600)
- Inowrocław (pop. 34 400) - since 1938
- Tczew (pop. 22 500)
- Chojnice (pop. 14 100)

== Ethnic and religious structure ==
According to the 1921 census the voivodeship was inhabited by 935,643 people, of whom by nationality 757,801 were Poles (81%), 175,771 were Germans (18.8%), 419 were Jews (0.04%) and 1,652 were all others (0.2%). By religion - according to the census of 1921 - 744,699 were Roman Catholics (79.6%), 186,224 were Protestants of all kinds (19.9%), 2,927 were Jews (0.3%) and 1,793 were all others (0.2%).

The detailed results of the 1931 census by county are presented below:

Linguistic (mother tongue) and religious structure of Pomeranian Voivodeship according to the 1931 census
County	Pop.	Polish	%	Yiddish & Hebrew	%	German	%	Other language %	Roman Catholic	%	Jewish	%	Protestant	%	Other religion %
Brodnica	56287	50990	90.6%	96	0.2%	5100	9.1%	0.2%	50642	90.0%	126	0.2%	5281	9.4%	0.4%
Chełmno	52765	44700	84.7%	23	0.0%	7930	15.0%	0.2%	43944	83.3%	53	0.1%	8354	15.8%	0.8%
Chojnice	76935	68999	89.7%	8	0.0%	7631	9.9%	0.4%	73960	96.1%	86	0.1%	2680	3.5%	0.3%
Działdowo	42716	39645	92.8%	117	0.3%	2862	6.7%	0.2%	35448	83.0%	173	0.4%	6979	16.3%	0.3%
Gdynia City	33217	32554	98.0%	24	0.1%	329	1.0%	0.9%	32205	97.0%	84	0.3%	515	1.6%	1.2%
Grudziądz City	54014	49636	91.9%	454	0.8%	3608	6.7%	0.6%	48554	89.9%	677	1.3%	3805	7.0%	1.8%
Grudziądz County	42801	34902	81.5%	0	0.0%	7760	18.1%	0.3%	34037	79.5%	16	0.0%	7953	18.6%	1.9%
Kartuzy	68674	64103	93.3%	19	0.0%	4445	6.5%	0.2%	64192	93.5%	50	0.1%	4358	6.3%	0.1%
Kościerzyna	51716	45658	88.3%	0	0.0%	5978	11.6%	0.2%	45362	87.7%	34	0.1%	6202	12.0%	0.2%
Lubawa	53621	51812	96.6%	65	0.1%	1612	3.0%	0.2%	51627	96.3%	86	0.2%	1640	3.1%	0.5%
Maritime County	85295	79658	93.4%	104	0.1%	5213	6.1%	0.4%	80091	93.9%	229	0.3%	4624	5.4%	0.4%
Sępólno	29563	17538	59.3%	31	0.1%	11942	40.4%	0.2%	19661	66.5%	140	0.5%	9585	32.4%	0.6%
Starogard	71829	67937	94.6%	258	0.4%	3433	4.8%	0.3%	67922	94.6%	351	0.5%	3261	4.5%	0.4%
Świecie	87998	74171	84.3%	129	0.1%	13422	15.3%	0.3%	73809	83.9%	338	0.4%	13156	15.0%	0.8%
Tczew	67399	62832	93.2%	64	0.1%	4359	6.5%	0.2%	63843	94.7%	112	0.2%	3198	4.7%	0.4%
Toruń City	53993	51006	94.5%	272	0.5%	2450	4.5%	0.5%	50453	93.4%	493	0.9%	2617	4.8%	0.8%
Toruń County	60214	52909	87.9%	39	0.1%	7124	11.8%	0.2%	52491	87.2%	53	0.1%	7326	12.2%	0.6%
Tuchola	41249	37990	92.1%	3	0.0%	3151	7.6%	0.3%	38829	94.1%	67	0.2%	2237	5.4%	0.3%
Wąbrzeźno	49852	42346	84.9%	259	0.5%	7051	14.1%	0.4%	41950	84.1%	279	0.6%	7041	14.1%	1.2%
Total	1080138	969386	89.7%	1965	0.2%	105400	9.8%	0.3%	969020	89.7%	3447	0.3%	100812	9.3%	0.6%

== German minority ==
In 1926 and 1934 German minority in Pomeranian Voivodeship carried out their own censuses, counting themselves. Here are their results:

County (German name in brackets)	ethnic German population (1926)	ethnic German population (1934)
Kościerzyna (Berent)	6,884	5,974
Wąbrzeźno (Briesen)	7,615	7,344
Chełmno (Culm)	7,905	7,673
Tczew (Dirschau)/ Gniew (Mewe)/ Świecie (Schwetz)	20,446	17,571
Grudziądz (Graudenz, town)	3,542	3,875
Grudziądz (Graudenz, district)	9,317	8,190
Kartuzy (Karthaus)	4,800	3,927
Chojnice (Konitz)	9,022	8,070
Lubawa (Löbau)	2,078	1,689
Wejherowo (Neustadt)/ Puck (Putzig)	6,556	6,305
Starogard Gdański (Pr. Stargard)	2,909	3,418
Działdowo (Soldau)/ Brodnica (Strasburg)	12,779	10,733
Toruń (Thorn, town)	2,255	2,057
Toruń (Thorn, district)	7,107	6,738
Tuchola (Tuchel)	3,170	2,861
Sępólno Krajeńskie (Zempelburg)	10,866	11,130
Pomeranian Voivodship (total)	117,251	107,555

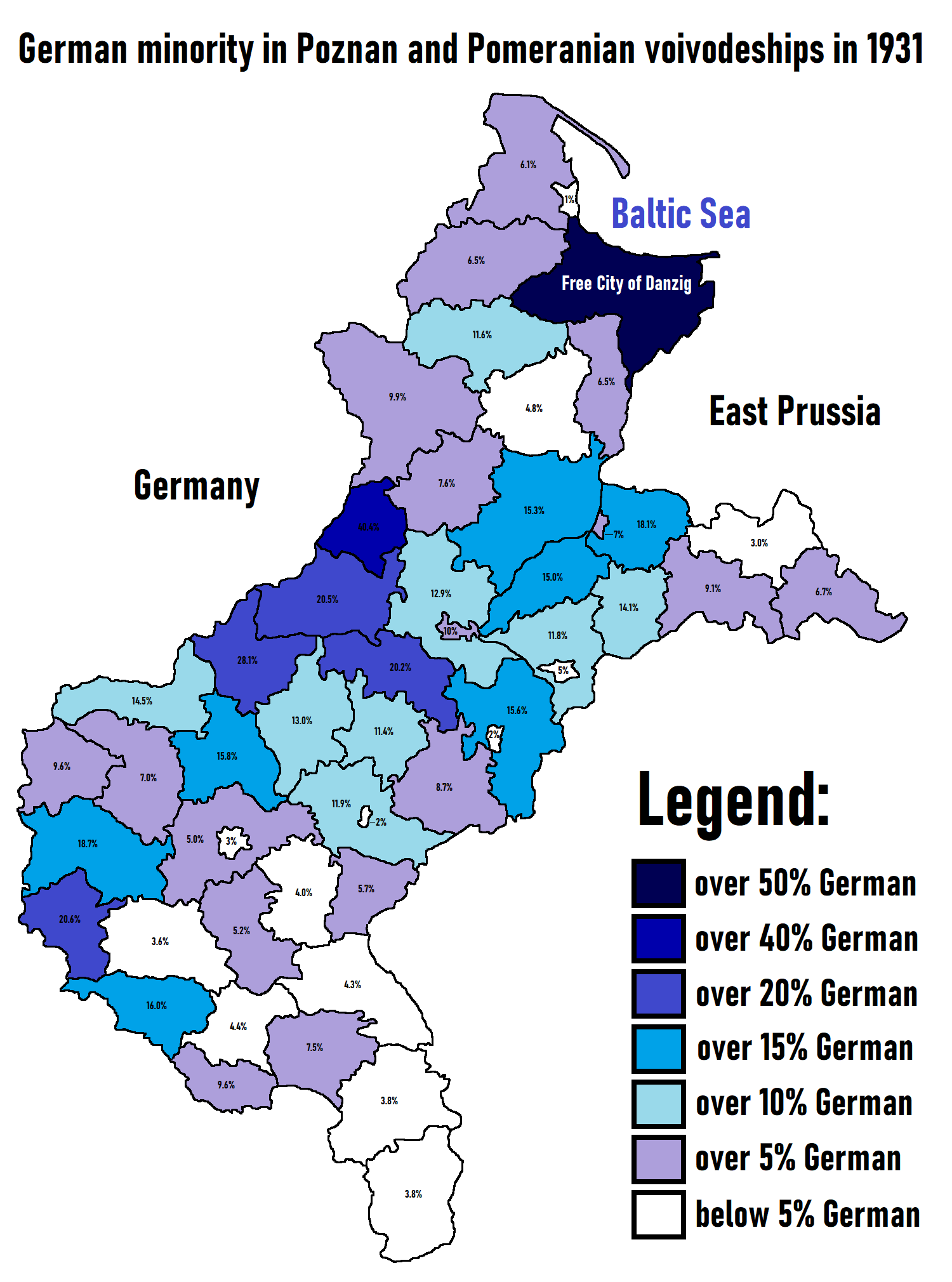
German minority in Pomeranian and Poznań voivodeships according to the 1931 Polish census

== Voivodes ==
- Stefan Łaszewski – 19 October 1919 – 2 July 1920
- Jan Brejski – 2 July 1920 – 24 March 1924
- Stanisław Wachowiak – 24 October 1924-August 1926
- Mieczysław Seydlitz – August 1926 – October 1926
- Kazimierz Młodzianowski – 12 October 1926 – 4 July 1928
- Wiktor Wrona-Lamot – 28 August 1928 – 18 November 1931
- Stefan Kirtiklis – 18 November 1931 – 14 July 1936
- Władysław Raczkiewicz – 16 July 1936 – 30 September 1939
