= Niepoczołowice-Folwark =

- Village
- Location within Poland
- Coordinates: 54°25′11″N 17°53′31″E
- Country: Poland
- Voivodeship: Pomeranian
- County: Wejherowo
- Gmina: Linia

Niepoczołowice-Folwark [ɲɛpɔt͡ʂɔwɔˈvit͡sɛ ˈfɔlvark] is a village in the administrative district of Gmina Linia, within Wejherowo County, Pomeranian Voivodeship, in northern Poland.

For details of the history of the region, see History of Pomerania.
