= Ligurian Republic =

French client state, replacing the Republic of Genoa

Ligurian Republic Repubblica Ligure (Italian) Repubbrica Ligure (Ligurian)
- 1797–1805
- Flag Coat of arms
- Motto: Libertà, Eguaglianza (Italian) ("Liberty, equality")
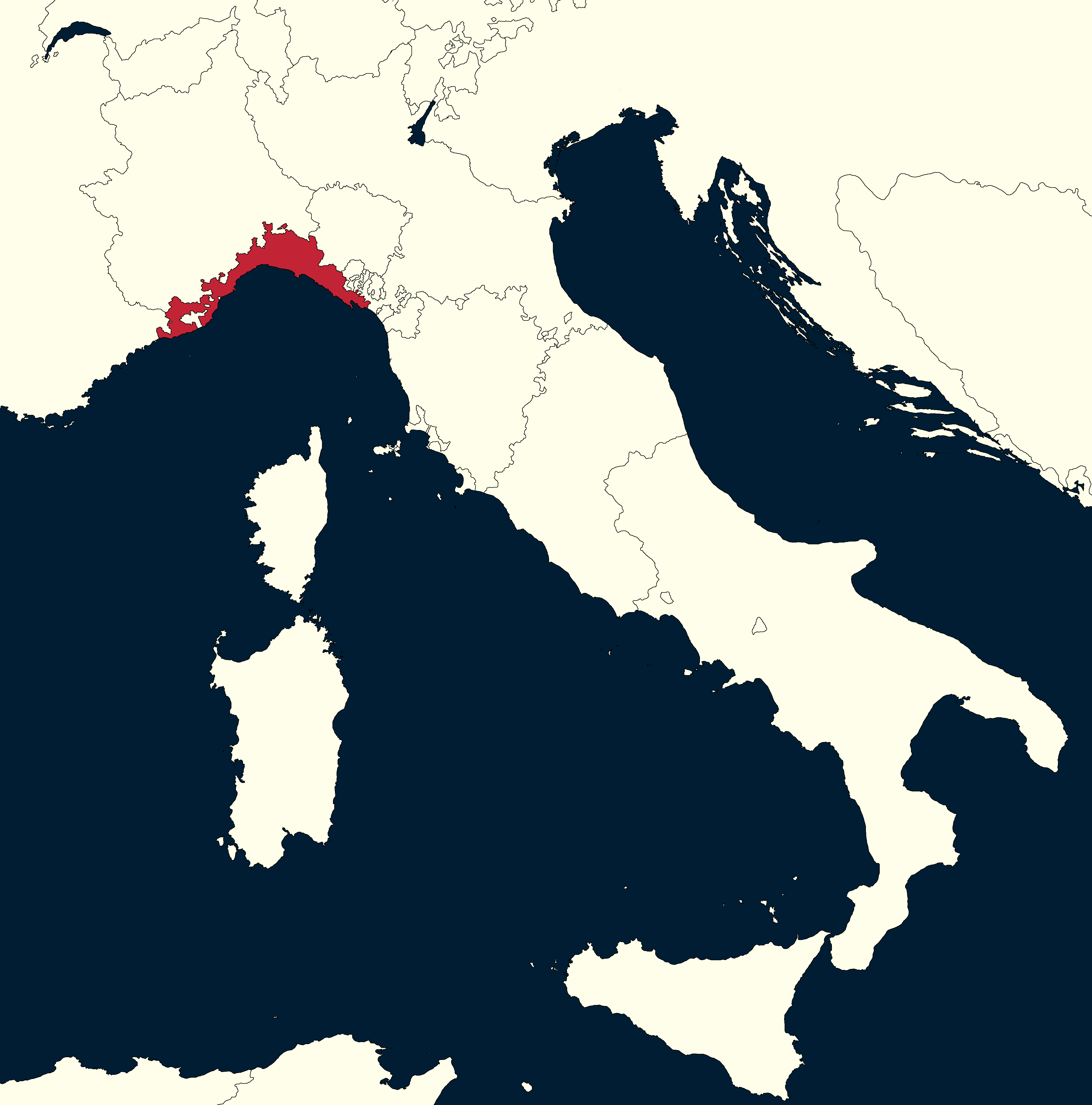
- Continental Italy in 1797
- Status: Sister republic of France
- Capital: Genoa
- Common languages: Italian, Ligurian
- Government: Directorial republic (First Constitution); Presidential Republic (After 1802)
- Doge
  - 1802–1805: Girolamo Luigi Durazzo
- Legislature: Legislative Council; Since 1800: National Council; Senate
  - Upper house: Council of Seniors
  - Lower house: Council of Sixty
- Historical era: Napoleonic Wars
  - Invaded by France: 14 June 1797
  - Annexed by France: 4 June 1805
- Currency: Genoese lira
Preceded by	Succeeded by
Republic of Genoa; Republic of Noli	First French Empire
- Today part of: Italy ∟ Liguria

The Ligurian Republic (Italian: Repubblica Ligure, Ligurian: Repubbrica Ligure, French: République ligure) or Republic of Liguria was a French client republic formed by Napoleon on 14 June 1797. It consisted of the old Republic of Genoa, which covered most of the Ligurian region of Northwest Italy, and the small Imperial fiefs owned by the House of Savoy inside its territory. Its first Constitution was promulgated on 22 December 1797, establishing a directorial republic. The directory was deposed on 7 December 1799 and the executive was temporarily replaced by a commission. In 1802, a doge was nominated for a 5-year term, according to the second Constitution imposed by Napoleon, and a Senate was established.

The Republic was briefly occupied by Austrian forces in 1800, but Napoleon soon returned with an army and retook it. A new Constitution was published in 1802, establishing institutions more similar to those of the previous Genoese Republic, with a Doge who was president of a Senate. The Ligurian Republic used the traditional Genoese flag, consisting of a red cross on a white background.

In June 1805, the territory was annexed by the First French Empire.

== History ==
After conflict was sparked in May 1797 between Genoese inhabitants regarding their wealthy rulers, Napoleon took Genoa and established his own order. The French engaged in a mass robbery of Genoa, leaving the people and their land in a ruinous state. Napoleon announced the founding of the Ligurian Republic on 6 June 1797. The people's cooperation under Napoleon's domain was undoubtedly brought on in part by Archbishop Giovanni Lercari, who showed his support of the French only three days later. A Ligurian constitution was crafted, which was unprogressive and meant only as a temporary document. That December, the constitution's replacement emerged. A large majority approved the constitution by plebiscite.

In June 1798, the rulers of the Ligurian Republic led the people into war against the Kingdom of Piedmont-Sardinia after exiles attempted to form an uprising. The French eventually intervened in the war, resulting in the French occupation of Piedmont.

In 1800, the Ligurian Republic was besieged by the Austrian army and British fleet. An estimated 30,000 casualties resulted from the conflicts, and the French army had to be relied on for economic restoration. Eventually, the Ligurian leaders placed themselves at the feet of Napoleon, asking that he take direct control. He accepted.

In June 1805, the area was directly annexed by France as the departements of the Apennins, Gênes and Montenotte. After the fall of Napoleon in 1814, the republic was briefly restored between 28 April and 28 July. Following the Congress of Vienna, it was awarded to Piedmont-Sardinia and annexed on 3 January 1815. Its territories formed the new Duchy of Genoa within the Savoyard state.
