= Danzig (surname) =

Danzig is a German-language surname, from the German name for the city of Gdańsk, now a part of Poland. Notable people with the surname include:

- Alex Dancyg (1948-2024), Polish-born Israeli historian
- Avraham Danzig (1748–1820), rabbi, author of works on Jewish law
- Glenn Danzig (born 1955), American singer, songwriter and publisher
- Jerome Alan Danzig (1913–2001). American reporter, news producer and political adviser
- Mac Danzig (born 1980), American professional mixed martial arts practitioner
- Richard Danzig (born 1944), American lawyer and former Secretary of the Navy

== See also ==
- Dantzig (surname)
- Danziger
