= Zygmunt Milczewski =

Polish historian

- Zygmunt Milczewski on his 90th birthday, 1995
- Born: 01.Oct.1905; Strzepcz, West Prussia, German Empire
- Died: June 2, 2001 (aged 95)
- Occupations: Writer, activist
- Writing career
- Notable work: Wejherowo i powiat morski

Zygmunt Milczewski (1 October 1905 – 2 June 2001) was a Polish historian associated with Pomerania, a community leader in the Second Polish Republic, and World War II resistance fighter in the underground Home Army (Armia Krajowa) with the postwar rank of Lieutenant (porucznik). During the darkest years of Stalinism in Poland he spent three years in prison from 1949 to 1952 as a so-called enemy of the state along with thousands of other political prisoners persecuted by the communist Urząd Bezpieczeństwa.

Milczewski is best remembered for his research into wartime history of his beloved province, with special focus on the attempted genocide of ethnic Poles of Pomerania in the course of Nazi Operation Tannenberg, known as Intelligenzaktion, including massacres in Piaśnica among various atrocities and expulsions.

== Life and work ==
Milczewski was born in Strzepcz near Wejherowo. He graduated from the Warsaw University in the field of economics and took up a post of secretary to mayor (wójt) of a rural community of Rumia-Zagórze in the interwar Poland; credited with helping the town grow quicker. After the invasion of Poland by Nazi Germany, Milczewski relocated to Kraków in the southern part of occupied Poland and joined the anti-Nazi underground, nom de guerre Wąsowicz. In 1942 he was assigned to Komenda Okręgu AK Kraków-Miasto (pl) with the rank of Podporucznik (the Second Lieutenant). For his resistance activities he was awarded four times by the Polish government-in-exile Ministry of National Defence (Ministerstwo Obrony Narodowej) with the Medal of Valor and the Cross of AK, locally. After the defeat of Nazi Germany Milczewski returned to Wejherowo and soon began his research into ani-Nazi resistance in Pomerania. His was thrown in prison in 1949 with the onset of the Stalinist terror in postwar Poland, and released in 1952. Milczewski was a member of the Światowy Związek Żołnierzy Armii Krajowej (World Union of the Home Army Soldiers). He died on 2 June 2001 at the age of 95, and was buried in Wejherowo.

=== Wejherowo chronicle ===
Milczewski published his heartrending book Wejherowo i Powiat Morski: Wrzesień 1939 - Maj 1945 (Wejherowo and the Marine County: September 1939 till May 1945) in Gdańsk soon after the collapse of the Soviet empire. Void of any emotional interpretation the book presents a chronological account of persecution of the Polish people in the town and its environs based on German and Polish archives, testimonies of survivors, his own historical research, and materials collected by the Polish scientific community. One of the more shocking facts revealed by Milczewski was that the large German minority who, for decades, lived next door to Polish Kashubians, have expressed hatred and rage towards them in that period, leading to nothing but death and destruction and yet Poles resisted the state-sanctioned Germanization.

== Books ==
- Zygmunt Milczewski, Wejherowo i powiat morski : wrzesień 1939 - maj 1945 : kronika Publisher: Gdańsk : [Selbstverl.], 1990.

== Notes and references ==
- Zygmunt Milczewski in libraries (WorldCat catalog)
