= Strzepcz =

- Village
- Location within Poland
- Coordinates: 54°27′N 18°2′E
- Country: Poland
- Voivodeship: Pomeranian
- County: Wejherowo
- Gmina: Linia
- Population: 981

Strzepcz (pronounced [stʂɛpt͡ʂ]) is a village in the administrative district of Gmina Linia, within Wejherowo County, Pomeranian Voivodeship in northern Poland. It lies approximately 7 km (4 mi) east of Linia, 22 km (14 mi) southwest of Wejherowo, and 40 km (25 mi) west of the regional capital Gdańsk. Its population is 981. For the region's history, see History of Pomerania. It was home to Kashubian Secondary School until 2012.

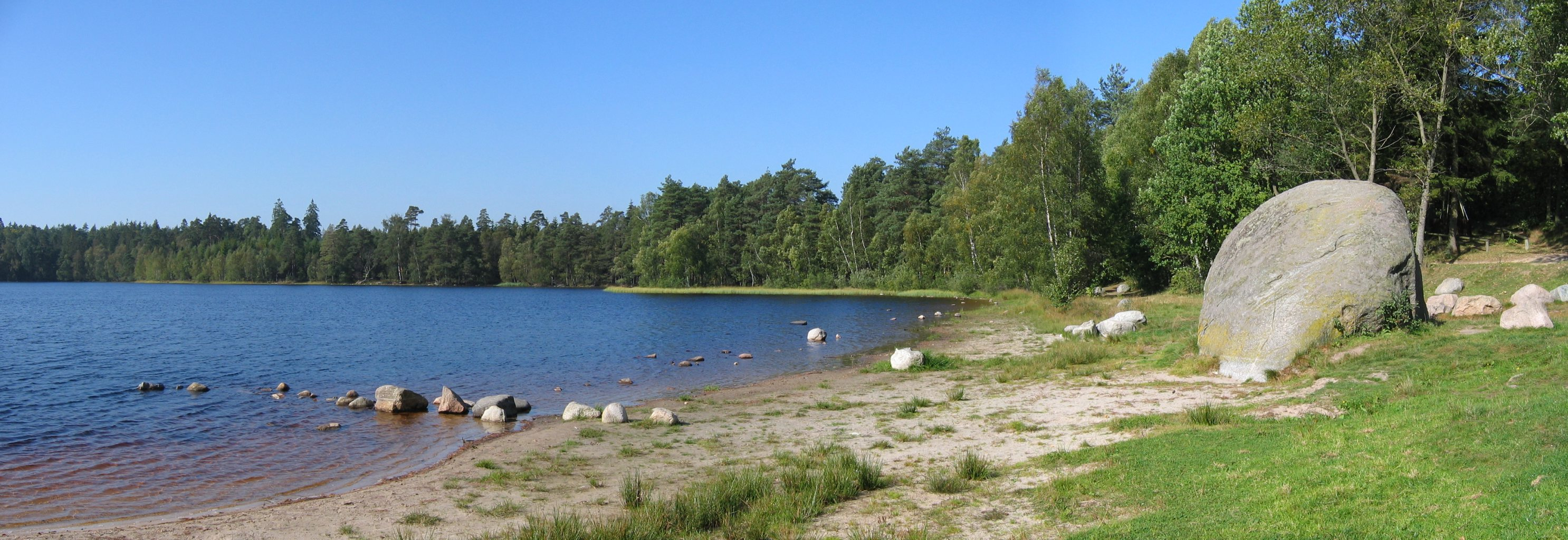
The Devil's Rock (Diabelski Kamień) to the right, the Nature Reserve "Żurawie Błota" along Lake Kamienne on the outskirts of Strzepcz

== Notable residents ==
- Historian Zygmunt Milczewski was born in Strzepcz.
