= Głodnica =

- Village
- Location within Poland
- Coordinates: 54°26′25″N 17°59′22″E
- Country: Poland
- Voivodeship: Pomeranian
- County: Wejherowo
- Gmina: Linia

Głodnica [ɡwɔdˈnit͡sa] is a village in the administrative district of Gmina Linia, within Wejherowo County, Pomeranian Voivodeship, in northern Poland.

For details of the history of the region, see History of Pomerania.
