= Potęgowo, Wejherowo County =

Potęgowo
- Village
- Location within Poland
- Coordinates: 54°25′24″N 17°55′48″E
- Country: Poland
- Voivodeship: Pomeranian
- County: Wejherowo
- Gmina: Linia
- Population: 64

Potęgowo [pɔtɛnˈɡɔvɔ] is a village in the administrative district of Gmina Linia, within Wejherowo County, Pomeranian Voivodeship, in northern Poland.

For details of the history of the region, see History of Pomerania.
