= Danziger =

Danziger, being related to Danzig (Gdańsk, Poland) is a surname. Notable people with the surname include:

- Adolphe Danziger De Castro (1859–1959), Jewish scholar, journalist, lawyer
- Aharon Danziger (fl. 1976–1984), Israeli paralympic volleyball player
- Allen Danziger (born 1942), American actor
- Avraham Danziger (1748–1820), rabbi, posek and codifier
- Cory Danziger, American actor, political activist
- Fred Danziger (1906–1948), American football player
- Harry Danziger (born 1938), American rabbi
- Jazzy Danziger (born 1984), American poet and editor
- Jeff Danziger (born 1943), political cartoonist and author
- Joan Danziger (born 1934), American sculptor
- Kurt Danziger (1926–2026), historian of psychology
- Lucy Danziger, American editor-in-chief of Self magazine
- Louis Danziger (born 1923), graphic designer and educator
- Max Danziger (born 1886), Rhodesian politician
- Nick Danziger (born 1958), British photo journalist
- Paula Danziger (1944–2004), children's author
- Simon Danziger (c.1579–c.1615), Dutch privateer and corsair
- Sheldon Danziger (born 1948), American economist
- Yitzhak Danziger (1916–1977), Israeli sculptor
- Yisrael Danziger, Mishmeret Yesha founder
- Yoram Danziger (born 1953), Israeli judge
- The Danzigers, Edward J. Danziger (1909–1999) and Harry Lee Danziger (1913–2005), American TV and film producers

== See also ==
- Danziger Bridge, a vertical lift bridge in Louisiana
- Danziger Höhe, a district within the Kingdom of Prussia
