= Gmina Linia =

Gmina Linia Gmina Lëniô Linia Commune
- Gmina
- Coat of arms
- Interactive map of Gmina Linia; Gmina Lëniô
- Coordinates (Linia): 54°27′7″N 17°56′1″E
- Country: Poland
- Voivodeship: Pomeranian
- County: Wejherowo
- Seat: Linia

Government
  - Mayor: Bogusława Engelbrecht

Area
  - Total: 119.82 km^{2} (46.26 sq mi)

Population (2006)
  - Total: 5,785
  - Density: 48.28/km^{2} (125.0/sq mi)
- Website: http://www.ug-linia.pl

Gmina Linia (Kashubian: Gmina Lëniô) is a rural gmina (administrative district) in Wejherowo County, Pomeranian Voivodeship, in northern Poland. Its seat is the village of Linia, which lies approximately 27 kilometres (17 mi) south-west of Wejherowo and 47 km (29 mi) west of the regional capital Gdańsk.

The gmina covers an area of 119.82 square kilometres (46.3 sq mi), and as of 2006 its total population is 5,785. It belongs to bilingual communes in Poland.

The gmina contains part of the protected area called Kashubian Landscape Park.

== Villages ==
Gmina Linia contains the villages and settlements of Dargolewo, Głodnica, Igrzeczna, Kętrzyno, Kobylasz, Leobór, Lewinko, Lewino, Linia, Miłoszewo, Niedźwiadek, Niepoczołowice, Niepoczołowice-Folwark, Osiek, Pobłocie, Potęgowo, Smażyno, Strzepcz, Tłuczewo and Zakrzewo.

== Neighbouring gminas ==
Gmina Linia is bordered by the gminas of Cewice, Kartuzy, Łęczyce, Luzino, Sierakowice and Szemud.
