= Wëkrëkùs =

Wëkrëkùs is a Kashubian trickster spirit. It is the protector of loners. Simultaneously, it was spirit of misfortune and was aiding those, who are laughing at others.

Wëkrëkùs' wooden sculpture in Kętrzyno is part of trail, Feel Kashubian spirit" and was chiseled by Jan Redźko in virtue of Aleksander Labuda's study ,,Bògòwie i dëchë naj przodków (przëłożënk do kaszëbsczi mitologii)".

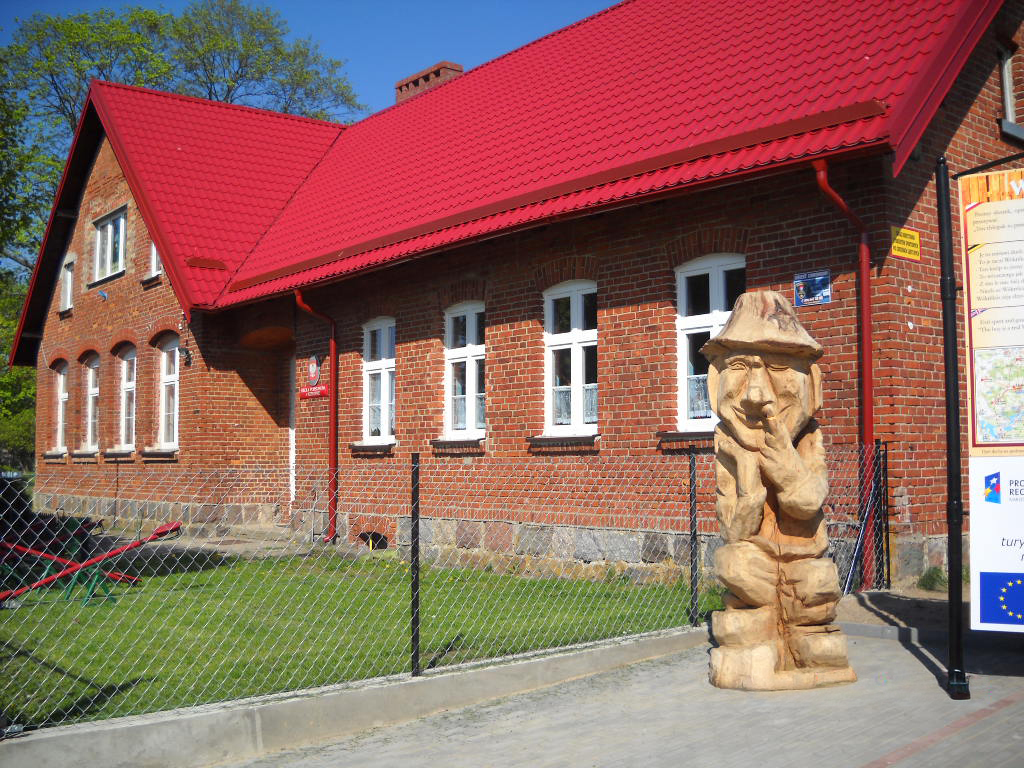
Wëkrëkùs' sculpture in Kętrzyno.
