= Danzig, North Dakota =

Unincorporated town in North Dakota, US

Coordinates: 46°08′17″N 99°28′29″W

Danzig was formerly an unincorporated town in McIntosh County, in North Dakota.

== History ==
A post office called Danzig was in operation from 1898 to 1903, but it closed due to lack of development. During a brief boom, it reopened in 1911 and stayed in operation until 1955. The community was named after Danzig, in Prussia (presently Gdańsk in Poland). The population was 75 in 1940.

According to a 2018 article in The American Conservative, "Danzig, North Dakota (peak population 100) lost its post office in 1955, and its entire population soon after. Today the town is all private property, and Main Street leads to the driveway of a nearby farmer."
