= SMS Danzig =

Several naval ships of Germany were named Danzig after the city of Danzig, modern-day Gdansk, Poland.

- SMS Danzig (1825), a gunboat
- SMS Danzig (1851), a corvette
- SMS Danzig (1905), a 3,300-ton Bremen-class light cruiser

== See also ==
- Peter von Danzig (ship)
