= Adaincourt =

- Commune
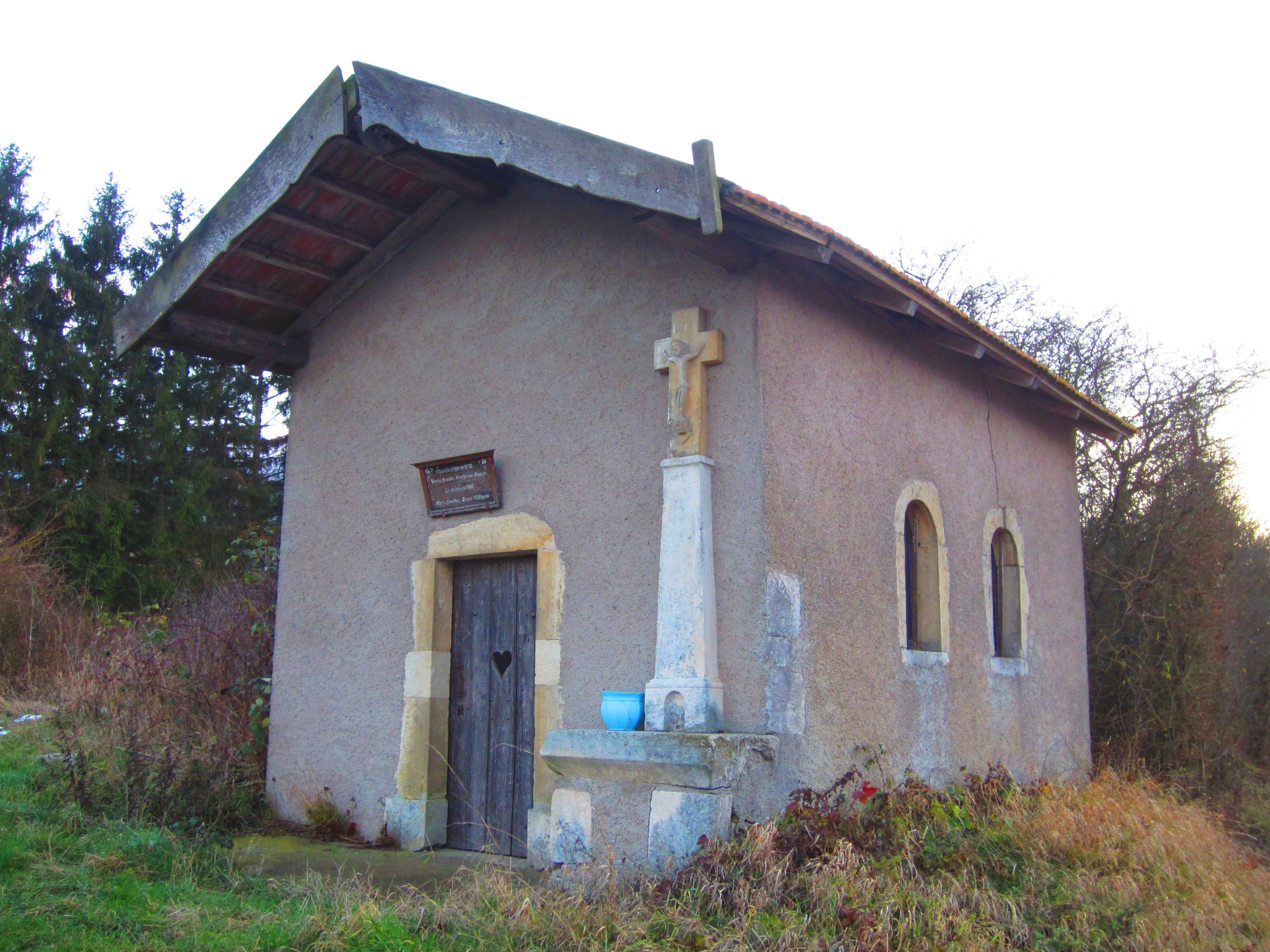
- The chapel in Adaincourt

- Coat of arms
- Location of Adaincourt
- Location within France Location within Grand Est
- Coordinates: 49°00′21″N 6°26′12″E
- Country: France
- Region: Grand Est
- Department: Moselle
- Arrondissement: Forbach-Boulay-Moselle
- Canton: Faulquemont
- Intercommunality: District Urbain de Faulquemont

Government
  - Mayor (2020–2026): Charlotte Pacifici
- Area^{1}: 3.42 km^{2} (1.32 sq mi)
- Elevation: 160 m (520 ft)
- Highest elevation: 273 m (896 ft)
- Lowest elevation: 221 m (725 ft)
- Population (2023): 135
  - Density: 39.5/km^{2} (102/sq mi)
- Time zone: UTC+01:00 (CET)
  - Summer (DST): UTC+02:00 (CEST)
- INSEE/Postal code: 57007 /57580
- ^{1} French Land Register data, which excludes lakes, ponds, glaciers > 1 km^{2} (0.386 sq mi or 247 acres) and river estuaries.

Adaincourt (French pronunciation: [adɛ̃kuʁ]; German: Adinghofen) is a commune in the Moselle department in Grand Est in northeastern France.

== Population ==
Historical population
Year	Pop.	±% p.a.
1968	74	—
1975	88	+2.51%
1982	84	−0.66%
1990	98	+1.95%
1999	107	+0.98%
2007	112	+0.57%
2012	117	+0.88%
2017	125	+1.33%
2023	135	+1.29%
Source: INSEE

== See also ==
- Communes of the Moselle department
