= Post SG Danzig =

German football club

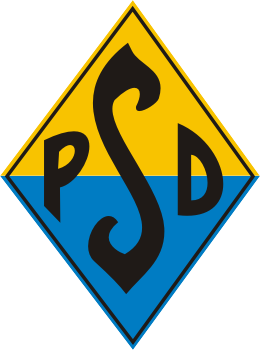
- Full name: Post-Sportgemeinschaft Danzig
- Founded: 1920s
- Dissolved: 1945
- Ground: Kampfbahn Niederstadt
- Capacity: 6000
- League: Gauliga Danzig-Westpreußen
Home colors

Post SG Danzig was a German association football club from the city of Danzig, West Prussia (today Gdańsk, Poland). It was the sports club of the city's postal workers and used the colours blue and yellow traditionally associated with the post office. In the early 1940s, the team was part of the Gauliga Danzig-Westpreußen, then one of Germany's regional first division circuits, where they earned only lower table finishes. Post SG was active until September 1945 and disappeared following World War II when the city became part of Poland.
