= Yoram Danziger =

Israeli judge

- יורם דנציגר
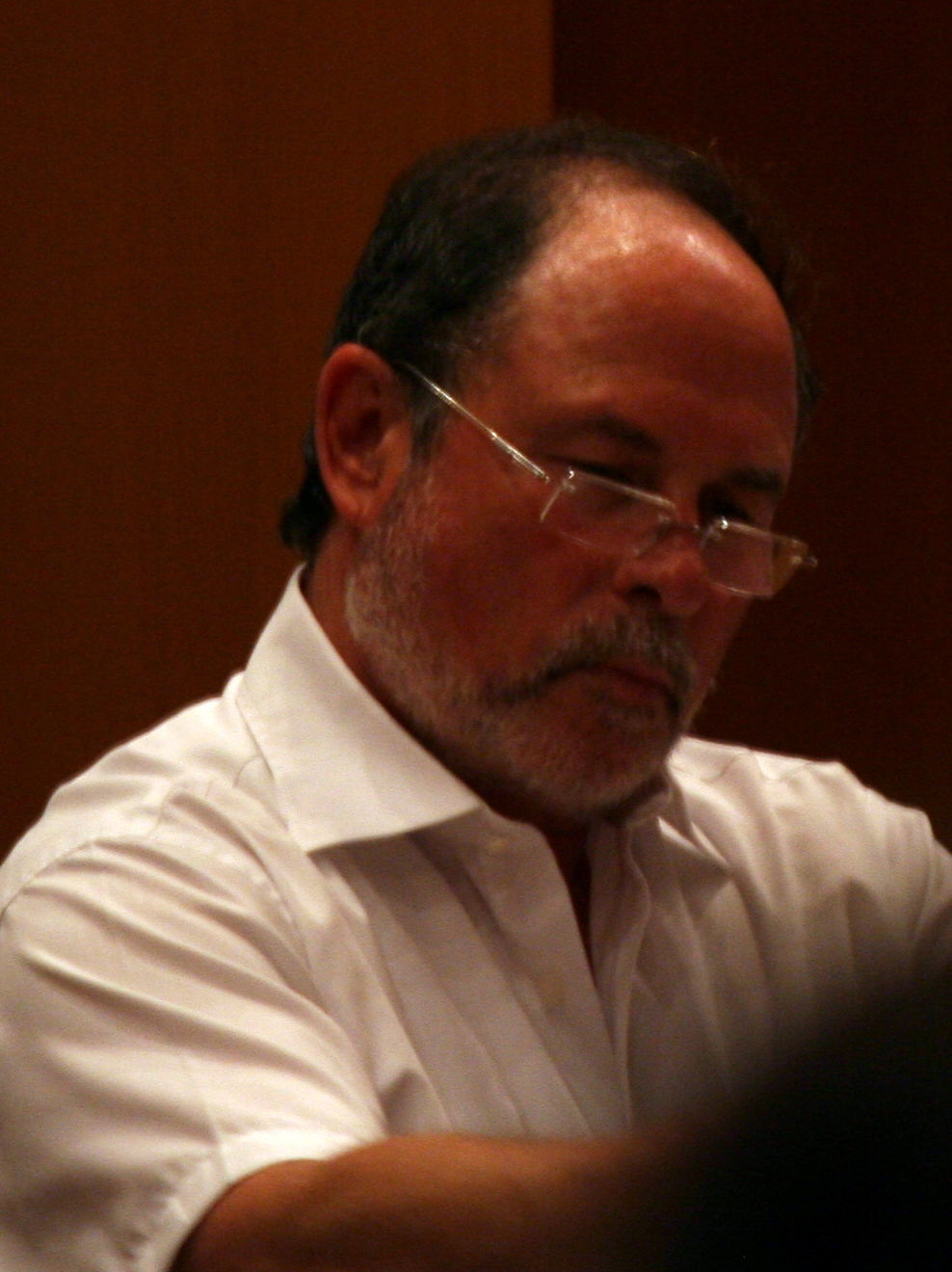
- Born: 1953 (age 72–73); Israel
- Education: LL.B. (Tel Aviv U.), LL.M. (Tel Aviv U.), Ph.D. (London School of Economics)
- Alma mater: Tel Aviv University
- Known for: Supreme Court of Israel Justice

Yoram Danziger (Hebrew: יורם דנציגר; born 1953) was a Justice of the Supreme Court of Israel who served on the Court from 2007 to 2018. Formerly he was managing partner and co-founder of a Ramat Gan-based law firm founded in 1984 named Danziger, Klagsbald & Co.

Born in Israel, Danziger served in the Israeli army from 1972 until 1975. He received his LL.B. degree with honors from Tel Aviv University in 1980, and his LL.M. Degree with honors from the same University in 1981. In 1983 he earned his PhD in law (take-over bids/tender offers) from the London School of Economics.

Danziger served as co-editor of the Israeli Bar Law Review. He taught Commercial Law at the Tel Aviv University and at the Herzliya Interdisciplinary Center. Danziger was a board member of the Association for Civil Rights in Israel. He published numerous legal articles in Israel and in the United Kingdom, focusing primarily on corporate law. In 2000 he published a book entitled 'The Right to Information about the Company'.

Danziger, who was a top commercial lawyer along with his partner Avigdor Klagsbald, was appointed with no opponents on the Judicial Appointments Committee. The appointment of a private sector attorney to the Supreme Court of Israel is not a common event.
