= Miłoszewo =

- Village
- Location within Poland
- Coordinates: 54°26′14″N 18°0′43″E
- Country: Poland
- Voivodeship: Pomeranian
- County: Wejherowo
- Gmina: Linia
- Population: 500

Miłoszewo [miwɔˈʂɛvɔ] is a village in the administrative district of Gmina Linia, within Wejherowo County, Pomeranian Voivodeship, in northern Poland.

For details of the history of the region, see History of Pomerania.
