= Danzig Highflyer =

Breed of pigeon

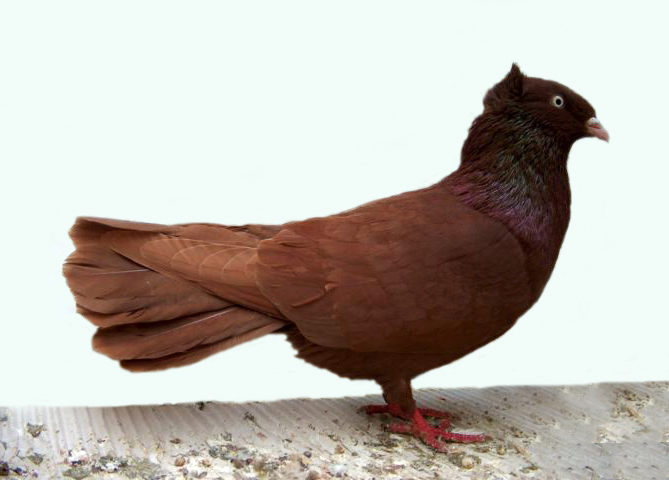
- Red self Danzig Highflyer
- Conservation status: Common
- Country of origin: Poland

Classification
- US Breed Group: high-flying
- EE Breed Group: Tumbler and Highflyer

The Danzig Highflyer (Polish: Sokół gdański) is a breed of fancy pigeon developed over many years of selective breeding. Danzig Highflyers, along with other varieties of domesticated pigeons, are all descendants from the rock pigeon (Columba livia). There are two major variates of the Danzig Highflyer: ones that are bred for show, and others as pets for flying.

== History ==
It is thought this breed had its origin in the vicinity of Danzig in 1807. Other sources point to the ancient province of Galicia-Poland.

== Flight Patterns ==
The Danzig is a high-flying solo flyer. The breed has excellent homing abilities, and is able to fly long distances at high altitudes. They have strong yet slow wing beats compared to other high-flyers.

== Gallery ==
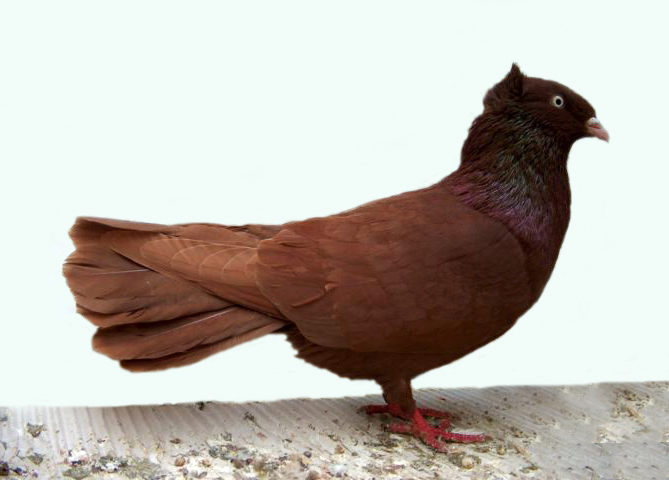
Red Danzig Highflyer

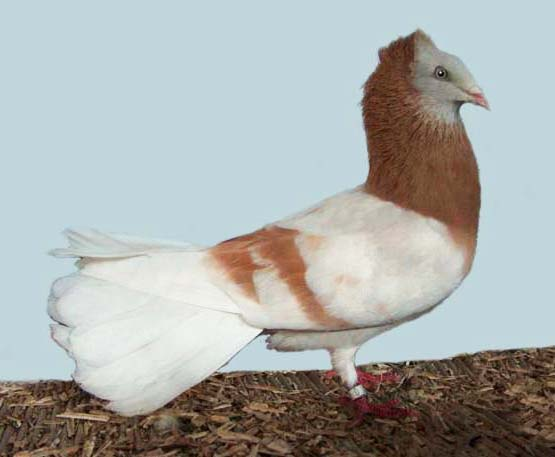
Cream bar Danzig Highflyer

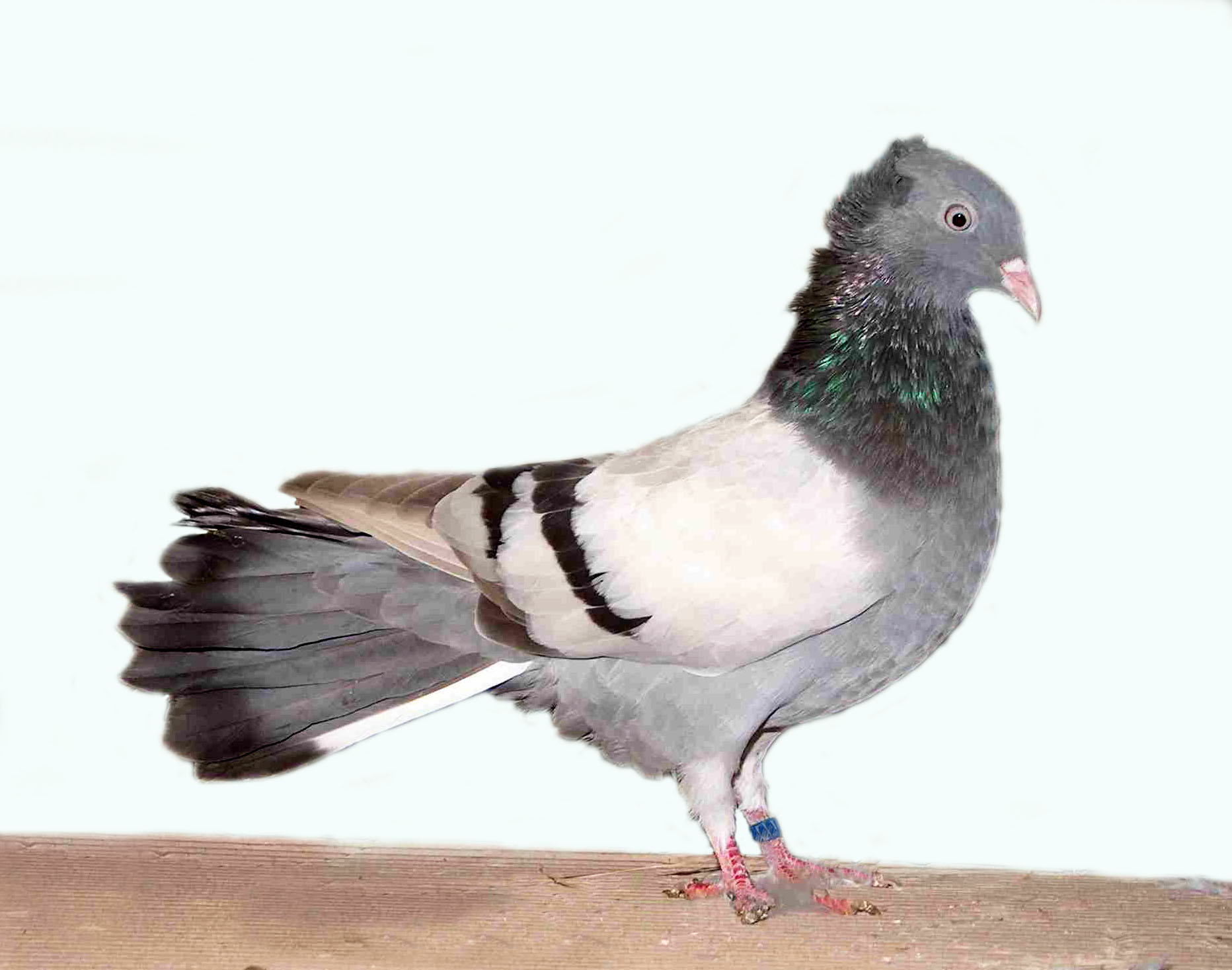
Silver bar Danzig Highflyer

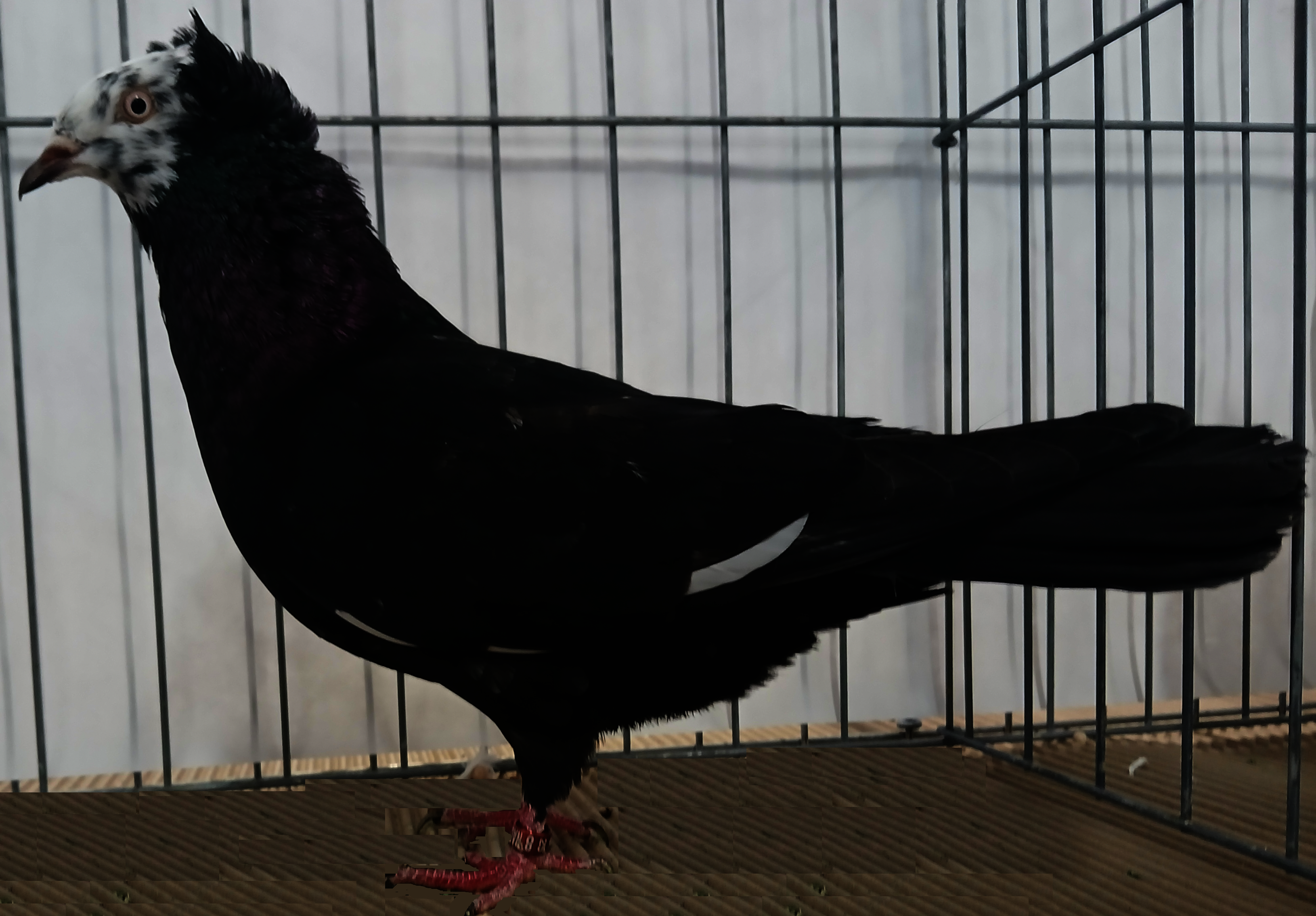
Black Danzig Highflyer

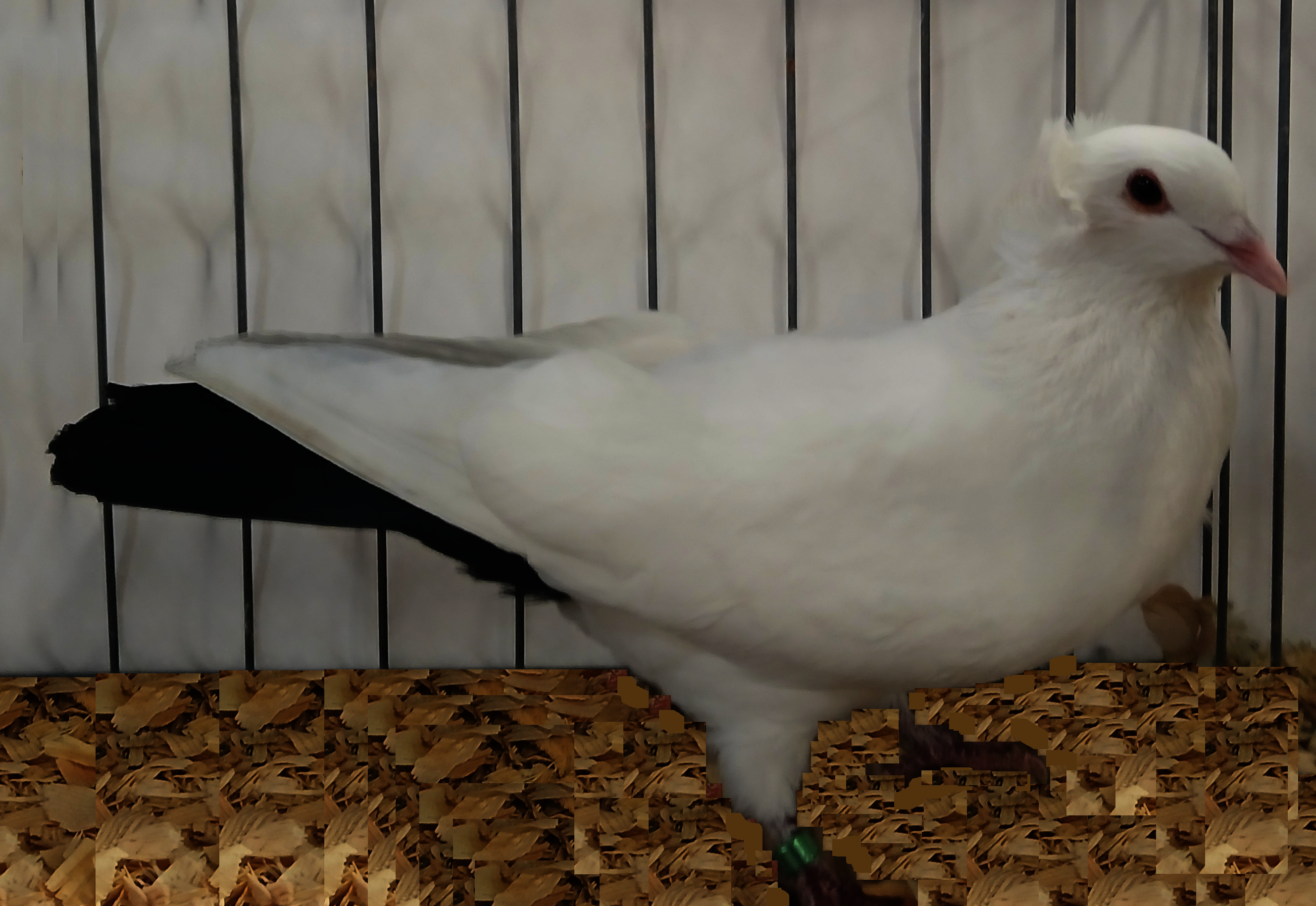
Tail mark

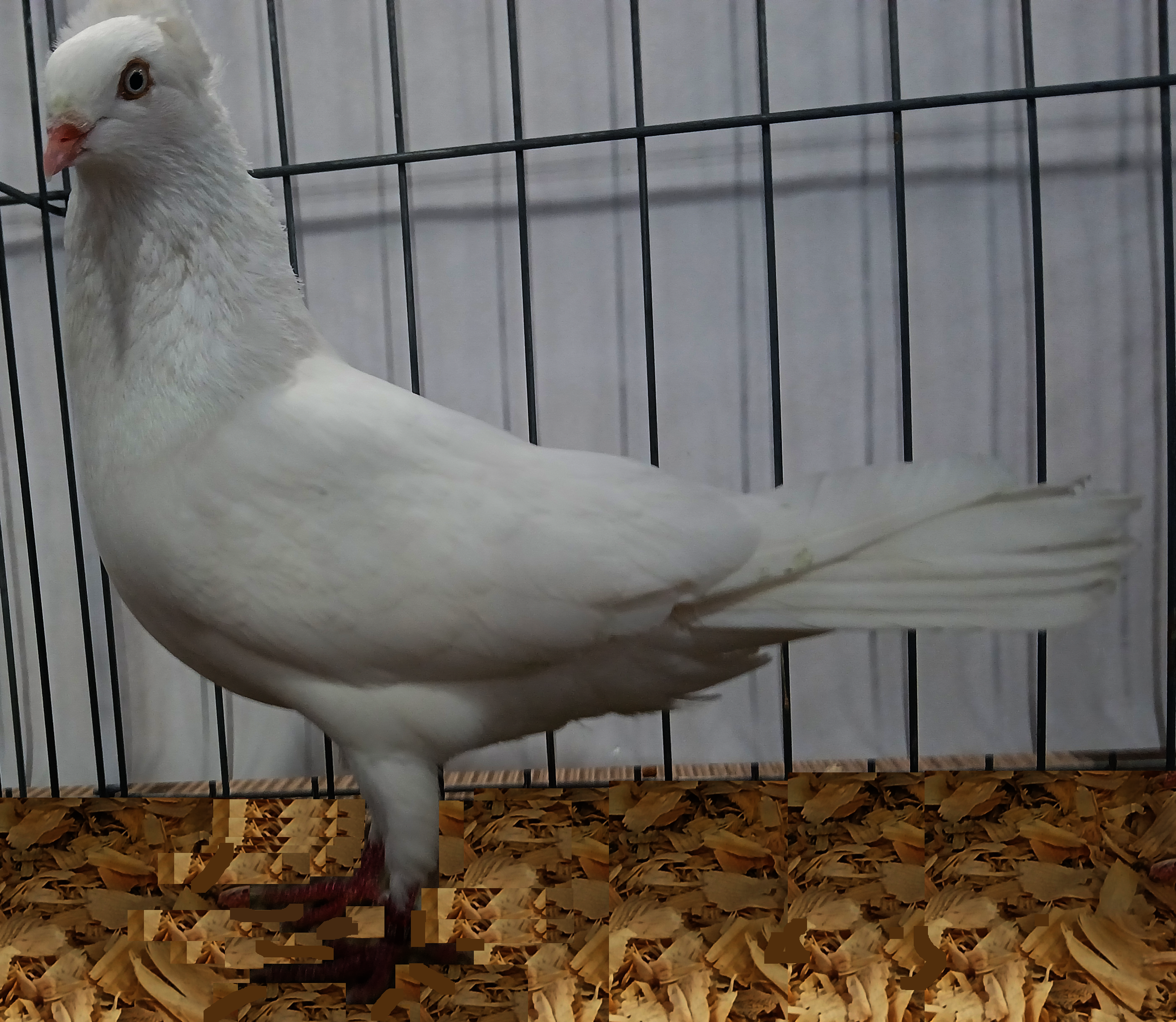
White

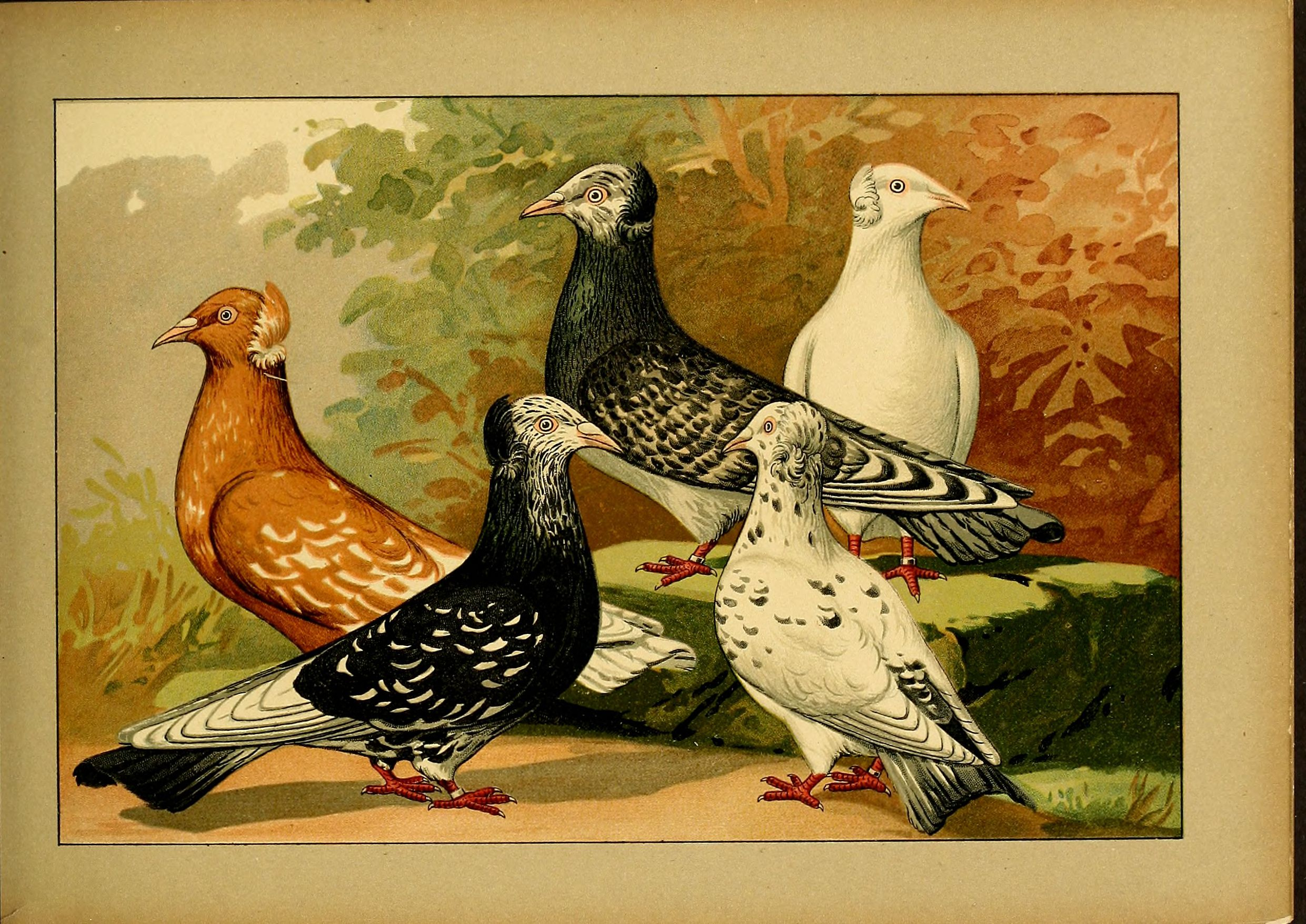
Schachtzabel 1906 Tafel 84

== See also ==
- Pigeon keeping
- List of pigeon breeds
