= Coat of arms of the Pomeranian Voivodeship =

Polish coat of arms

The Coat of Arms of the Pomeranian Voivodship

The coat of arms of the Pomeranian Voivodship is a griffin in black with raised wings, and red tongue on a yellow field. This heraldry dates back to the 16th century in a presbytery of the Oliwa Cathedral. The coat of arms was officially adopted in 2002.

This heraldric Griffin is of Pomeranian-Wendish origin.

The image of the black griffin looking towards the right, on a yellow background, is also known for being the coat of arms of Kashubians. Therefore, these two coats of arms are often identified; according to some sources, as being one and an identical coat of arms.

The creator of the coat of arms is Wawrzyniec Samp.

== Polish-Lithuanian Commonwealth ==
Between the years of 1454 and 1795, the coat of arms of the Pomeranian Voivodship was represented by a red griffin on a white background.

== Second Polish Republic ==
The coat of arms did alter substantially, "the coat of arms still included a red griffin looking to the left on a white background. The front legs were positioned as if they were to run, wings as if they were preparing to flight, the tongue was hanging out, and a crown on the head". There was a certain amount of controversy regarding the griffin being the coat of arms, as the former Chełmińskie Voivodeship had now been incorporated within the Pomeranian Voivodeship, whose coat of arms was a sworded eagle.

== Historical ==
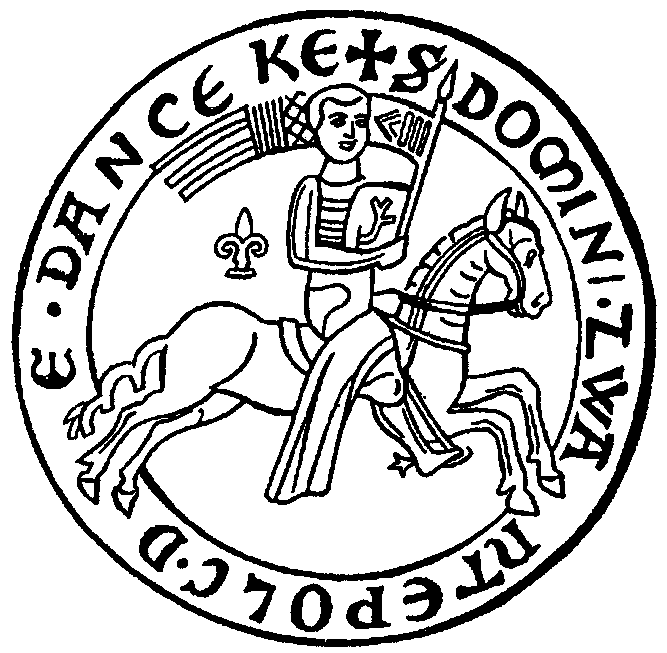
Seal of Swietopelk II, 1228

Malbork Voivodeship

Pomeranian Voivodeship (1466–1772)

West Prussia

Free City of Danzig

Pomeranian Voivodeship (1919–1939)

Gdańsk Voivodeship (1996–1998)

Pomeranian Voivodeship (2008–2010)

Pomeranian Voivodeship (2010–)

== Heraldry ==
Kashubian Griffin in heraldry:

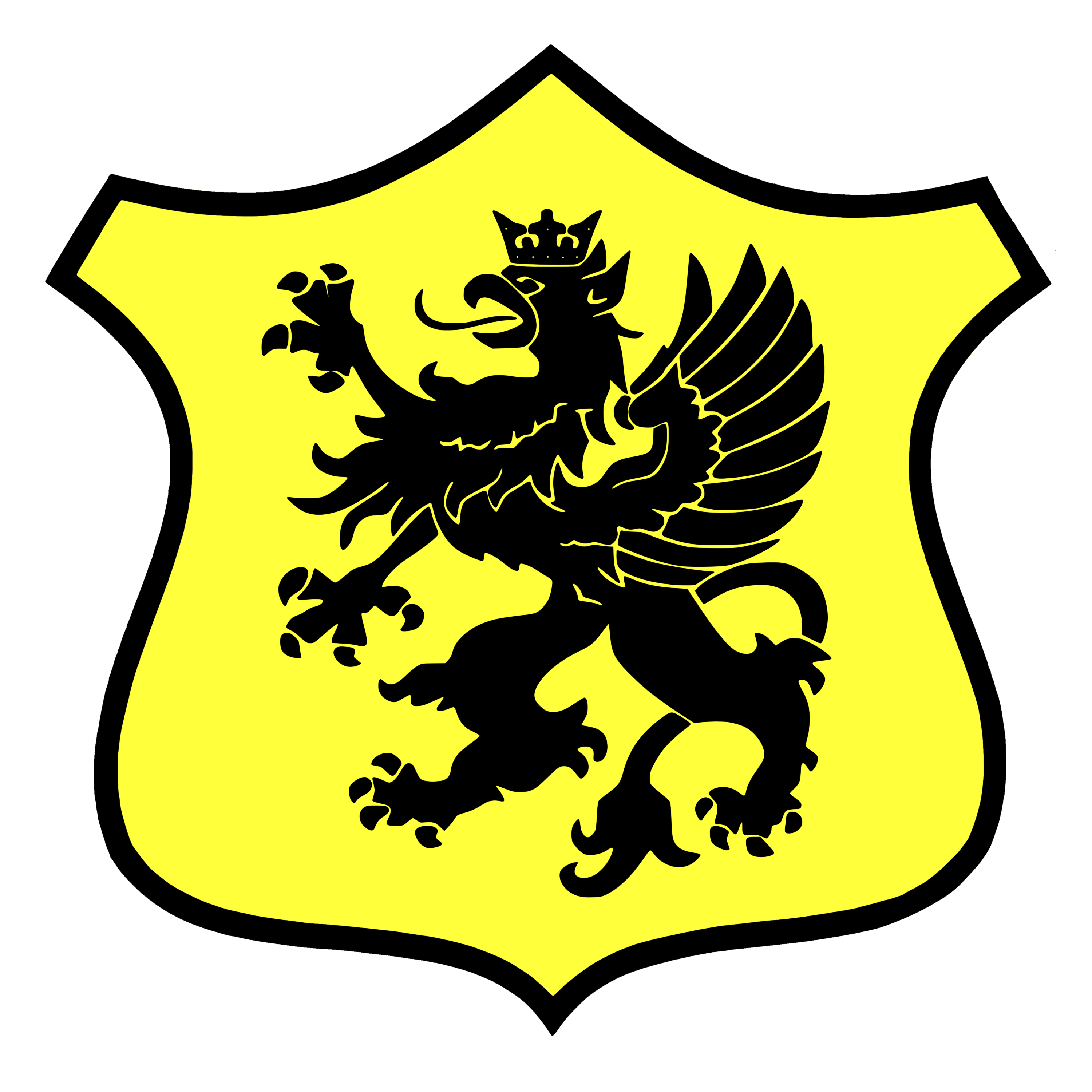
Popular coat of arms of Kashubia

On the coat of arms of Duchy of Pomerania

On the coat of arms of Pomeranian Voivodeship

Old coat of arms of Kashubia

Kashubian Griffin on coats of arms of Polish cities and towns:

Kartuzy

Szczecinek

Władysławowo

Żukowo
