= Gdańsk Voivodeship (1945–1975) =

Former voivodeship of Poland

Gdańsk Voivodeship Województwo gdańskie
- Voivodeship of Poland
- 1945–1975
- The Gdańsk Voivodeship within Poland, between 1950 and 1975.
- Capital: Sopot (1945); Gdańsk (1945–1975)
- Area
  - 1946: 10,725 km^{2} (4,141 sq mi)
  - 1950: 12,744 km^{2} (4,920 sq mi)
  - 1974: 11,036 km^{2} (4,261 sq mi)
- Population
  - 1946: 732 150
  - 1974: 1 564 000
  - Type: Voivodeship
- History
  - Established: 7 April 1945
  - Disestablished: 31 May 1975
- Contained within
  - Country: Provisional Government of the Republic of Poland (1944–1945) Provisional Government of National Unity (1945–1947); Polish People's Republic (1947–1975)
Preceded by
Reichsgau Danzig-West Prussia
West Pomeranian District
Masurian District
Succeeded by
Elbląg Voivodeship
Gdańsk Voivodeship
Słupsk Voivodeship

The Gdańsk Voivodeship (Note: Polish: Województwo gdańskie) was a voivodeship (province) with capital in Gdańsk, that was located in the region of Pomerelia. It existed from 1945 to 1975. Until 28 June 1945, it remained under the administration of the Provisional Government of the Republic of Poland, which then was replaced by the Provisional Government of National Unity. On, 19 February 1947, the provisional government was replaced by the Polish People's Republic. It was established on 7 April 1945, from the parts of the territories of the Pomeranian Voivodeship, and the Masurian District, Poland. The voivodeship ceased to exist on 31 May 1975, when it was partitioned by then-established voivodeships of Elbląg, Gdańsk, and Słupsk.

== History ==
Gdańsk Voivodeship within Poland, from 1946 to 1950.

The Gdańsk Voivodeship was established on 7 April 1945. The decree to establish the voivodeship had been signed on 30 March 1945, the day that Soviet and Polish forces captured the city of Gdańsk, during the Siege of Danzig, in the final months of the World War II. Upon its creation, it incorporated the counties from the prewar Pomeranian Voivodeship and the Free City of Danzig, both merged during occupation into the Reichsgau Danzig-Westpreußen. From the Pomeranian Voivodeship, it incorporated the counties of Kartuzy, Kościerzyna, Maritime, Starogard, Tczew, and the city county of Gdynia, while the southern part of the Pomeranian Voivodeship was awarded to the newly established Bydgoszcz Voivodeship. From the Free City of Danzig, it incorporated the Gdańsk County and the city county of Gdańsk. The city of Gdańsk was declared capital of the voivodeship. However due to the heavy destruction of the city during the conflict, for the first few months of voivodeship existence, its de facto seat of government was located in nearby city of Sopot, before it was transferred to Gdańsk, later that year.

Until 28 June 1945, it was under the administration of the Provisional Government of the Republic of Poland, which then had been replaced by the Provisional Government of National Unity, and on the 19 February 1947, the provisional government was replaced by the Polish People's Republic.

Upon dissolution of the Masurian District on 25 September 1945, Gdańsk Voivodeship incorporated its part containing the territories of the former Regierungsbezirk Westpreußen, namely the counties of Elbląg, Kwidzyn, Lębork, Malbork, and Sztum, as well as the counties of Bytów, Miastko, Sławno, and Słupsk from the District of the Western Pomerania. On 28 June 1946, the counties of Bytów, Miastko, Sławno, and Słupsk, were incorporated into the Szczecin Voivodeship, and later transferred on 8 July 1950 to the newly established Koszalin Voivodeship. In 1946 it had an area of 10 725 km², and a population of 732 150 people.

Between 1946 and 1950, the cities of Sopot and Elbląg become the city counties. On 1 July 1951, the Maritime County was replaced by the Wejherowo County. On 1 January 1954 was established the Nowy Dwór Gdański County, from the part of the Gdańsk County. On 1 October 1954 was established the Puck County, from the part of the Wejherowo County. In 1970 the voivodeship had an area of 11 036 km², and in 1974, it had a population of 1 564 000 people.

The Gdańsk Voivodeship existed until 31 May 1975, when it was partitioned between then-established voivodeships of Elbląg, Gdańsk, and Słupsk

== Subdivisions ==
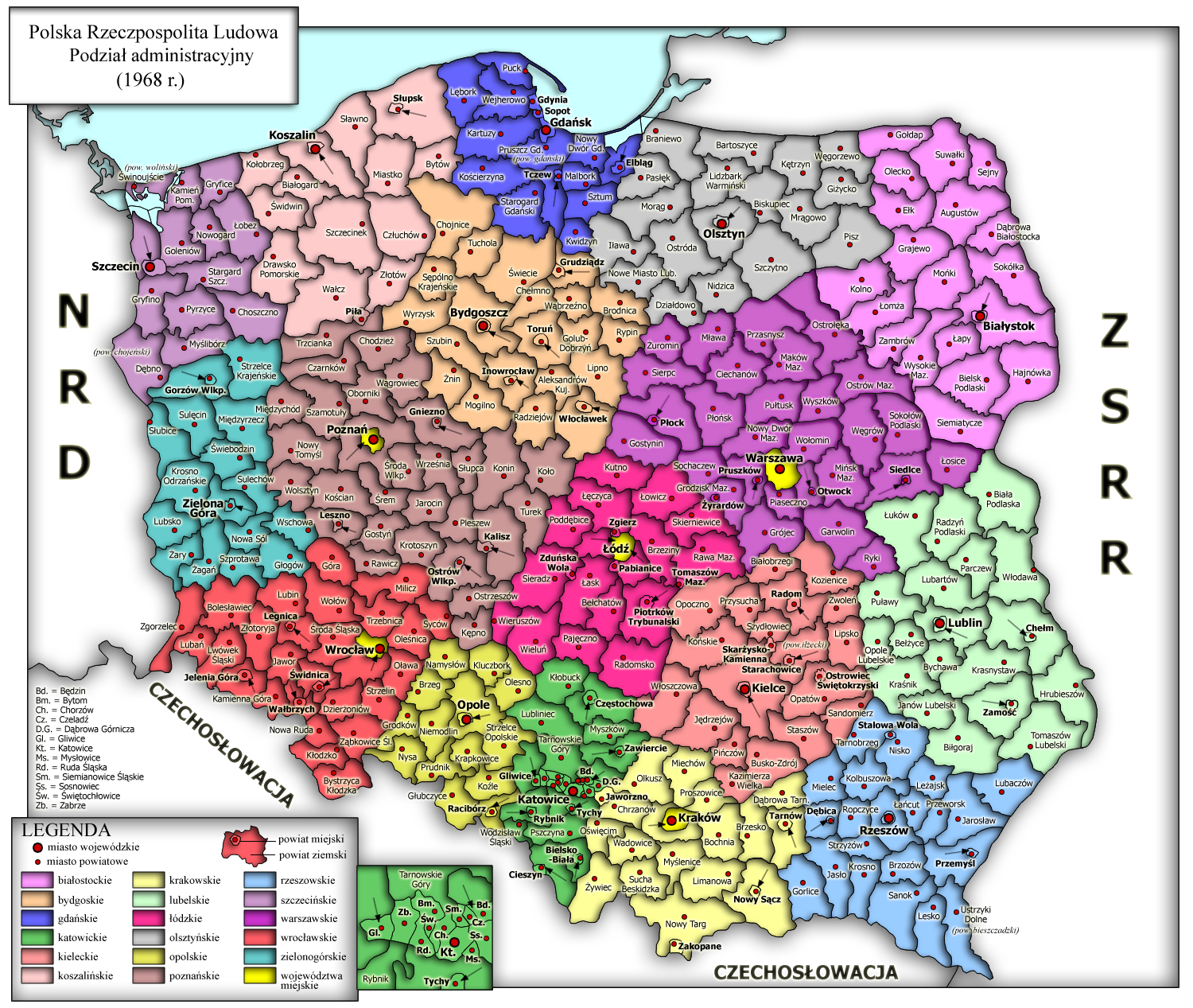
The counties of Poland in 1968, including the counties of the Gdańsk Voivodeship.

The voivodeship was divided into counties. Over the years, those were:

- Bytów County (seat: Bytów; 1945–1946);
- Elbląg (city county);
- Elbląg County (seat: Elbląg);
- Gdańsk (city county);
- Gdańsk County (seat: Pruszcz Gdański);
- Gdynia (city county);
- Kartuzy (seat: Kartuzy);
- Kościerzyna (seat: Kościerzyna);
- Kwidzyn County (seat: Kwidzyn);
- Lębork County (seat: Lębork);
- Nowy Dwór Gdański County (seat: Nowy Dwór Gdański; 1954–1975);
- Malbork County (seat: Malbork);
- Maritime County (seat: Wejherowo; 1945–1951);
- Miastko County (seat: Miastko; 1945–1946);
- Puck County (seat: Puck; 1954–1975);
- Sławno County (seat: Sławno; 1945–1946);
- Słupsk County (seat: Słupsk; 1945–1946);
- Sopot (city county);
- Starogard County (seat: Starogard Gdański);
- Sztum County (seat: Sztum);
- Tczew County (seat: Tczew);
- Wejherowo County (seat: Wejherowo; 1951–1975).

== Demographics ==
Year	Population		
Year	Total	Urban (%)	Rural (%)
1946	732 150	366 313 (50.03%)	365 837 (49.97%)
1950	930 448	539 463 (57.98%)	390 985 (42.02%)
1956	1 126 000	727 000 (64.6%)	399 000 (35.4%)
1960	1 222 769	811 468 (66.36%)	411 301 (33.64%)
1963	1 312 000	880 000 (67.1%)	432 000 (32.9%)
1965	1 352 800	no data	no data
1970	1 467 755	1 020 704 (69.54%)	447 051 (30.46%)
1971	1 486 900	1 039 000 (69.9%)	447 900 (30.1%)
1972	1 510 600	1 060 400 (70.2%)	450 200 (29.8%)
1973	1 539 000	1 100 000 (71.4%)	439 000 (28.6%)
1974	1 564 000	1 122 000 (71.8%)	442 000 (28.2%)

== Leaders ==
From 1944 to 1950, the leader of the voivodeship was the voivode. In 1950, the office of the voivode, together with several others, had been disestablished. As such, from 1950, to 1973, the leader was the chairperson of the Voivodeship National Council. The office of the voivode was reestablished in 1973, however it remained vacant until the disestablishment of the voivodeship in 1975.

The people in the office of the voivode, from 1944 to 1950 were:

- 30 March 1945 – 24 January 1946: Mieczysław Okęcki;
- 24 January 1946 – 25 May 1950: Stanisław Zrałek.

The people in the office of the chairperson of the Voivodeship National Council, from 1950 to 1973, were:

- 25 May 1950 – 28 March 1952: Mieczysław Wągrowski;
- 23 April 1952 – 4 March 1954: Bolesław Geraga;
- 4 March 1954 – 26 November 1956: Walenty Szeliga;
- 26 November 1956 – 16 November 1960: Józef Wołek;
- 16 November 1960 – 9 June 1969: Piotr Stolarek;
- 9 June 1969 – 20 January 1972: Tadeusz Bejm;
- 20 January 1972 – 9 December 1973: Henryk Śliwowski.
