= Kętrzyno =

- Village
- Location within Poland
- Coordinates: 54°29′16″N 17°56′27″E
- Country: Poland
- Voivodeship: Pomeranian
- County: Wejherowo
- Gmina: Linia
- Population: 404

Kętrzyno [kɛnˈtʂɨnɔ] is a village in the administrative district of Gmina Linia, within Wejherowo County, Pomeranian Voivodeship, in northern Poland.

Kętrzyno is part of tourist route ,,Feel Kashubian spirit", which consists of 13 wooden sculptures carved by Jan Redźko in virtue of Aleksander Labuda's study ,,Bògòwie i dëchë naj przodków (przëłożënk do kaszëbsczi mitologii)". Sculpture in Kętrzyno shows Wëkrëkùs.

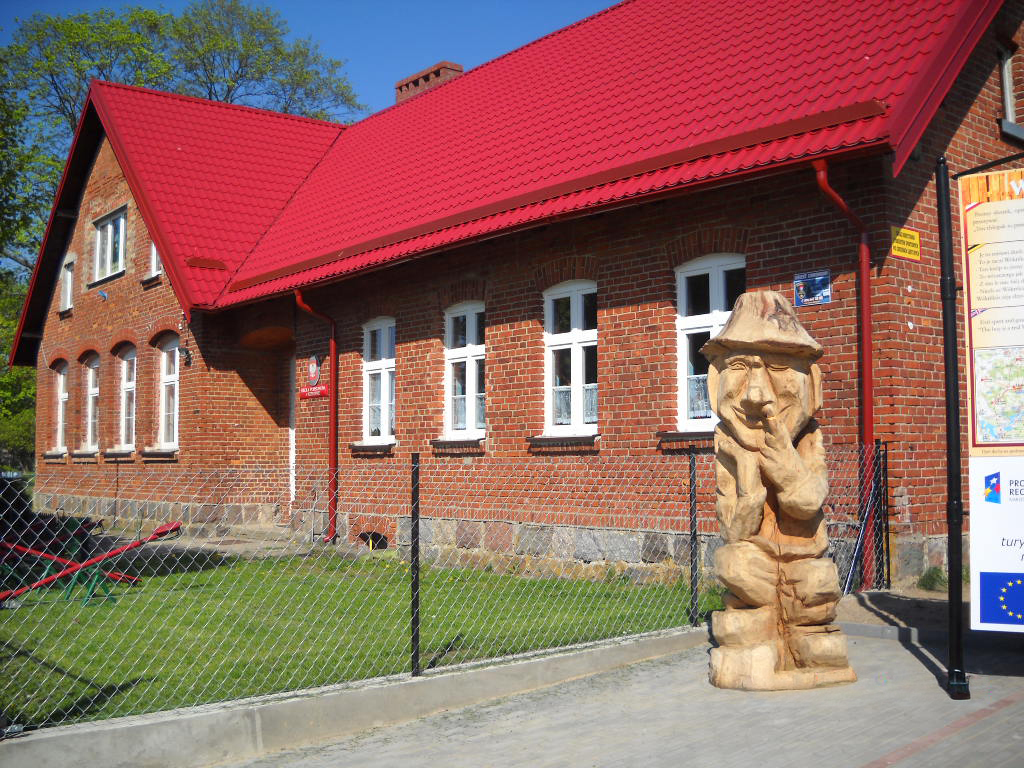

For details of the history of the region, see History of Pomerania.
