= Tłuczewo =

- Village
- Location within Poland
- Coordinates: 54°27′46″N 17°58′23″E
- Country: Poland
- Voivodeship: Pomeranian
- County: Wejherowo
- Gmina: Linia
- Population: 220

Tłuczewo [twuˈt͡ʂɛvɔ] is a village in the administrative district of Gmina Linia, within Wejherowo County, Pomeranian Voivodeship, in northern Poland.

For details of the history of the region, see History of Pomerania.
