= Linia, Pomeranian Voivodeship =

Linia
- Village
- Location within Poland
- Coordinates: 54°27′7″N 17°56′1″E
- Country: Poland
- Voivodeship: Pomeranian
- County: Wejherowo
- Gmina: Linia
- Population: 1,405

Linia [ˈliɲa] is a village in Wejherowo County, Pomeranian Voivodeship, in northern Poland. It is the seat of the gmina (administrative district) called Gmina Linia. Kashubian is spoken in the village as a secondary language.

For details of the history of the region, see History of Pomerania.
