= Gdańsk Voivodeship (1975–1998) =

Former voivodeship of Poland

Coordinates: 54°21′29″N 18°39′19″E

- Voivodeship of the Polish People's Republic and Third Republic of Poland
- 1975–1998
- Coat of arms

- The administrative subdivisions of Poland from 1975 to 1998, including the Gdańsk Voivodeship.
- Capital: Gdańsk
- Area
  - 1997: 7,394 km^{2} (2,855 sq mi)
- Population
  - 1975: 1 249 300
  - 1997: 1 249 300
- Government
  - Type: Voivodeship
- Voivode
  - 1975–1979 (first): Henryk Śliwowski
  - 1998 (last): Tomasz Sowiński
- History
  - Established: 1 June 1975
  - Disestablished: 31 December 1998
- Contained within
  - Country: Polish People's Republic (1975–1989); Third Republic of Poland (1989–1998)
- Political subdivisions: 63 gminas (1997)
Preceded by	Succeeded by
Gdańsk Voivodeship; Bydgoszcz Voivodeship	Pomeranian Voivodeship

The Gdańsk Voivodeship (Note: Polish: Województwo gdańskie) was a voivodeship (province) of the Polish People's Republic from 1975 to 1989, and the Third Republic of Poland from 1989 to 1998. Its capital was Gdańsk, and it was centered on the region of Pomerelia. It was established on 1 June 1975, from the parts of the voivodeships of Gdańsk, and Bydgoszcz, and existed until 31 December 1998, when it was incorporated into then-established Pomeranian Voivodeship.

== History ==
The Gdańsk Voivodeship was established on 1 June 1975, as part of the administrative reform, and was one of the voivodeships (provinces) of the Polish People's Republic. It was formed from the part of the territory of the Gdańsk Voivodeship, and a one gmina (municipality) of the Chojnice County, Bydgoszcz Voivodeship. Its capital was located in the city of Gdańsk. In 1975, it had a population of 1 249 300 people.

On 9 December 1989, the Polish People's Republic was replaced by the Third Republic of Poland. In 1997, the voivodeship had a population of 1 464 800 people, and had an area of 7 394 km^{2}. It existed until 31 December 1998, when it was incorporated into then-established Pomeranian Voivodeship.

== Subdivisions ==
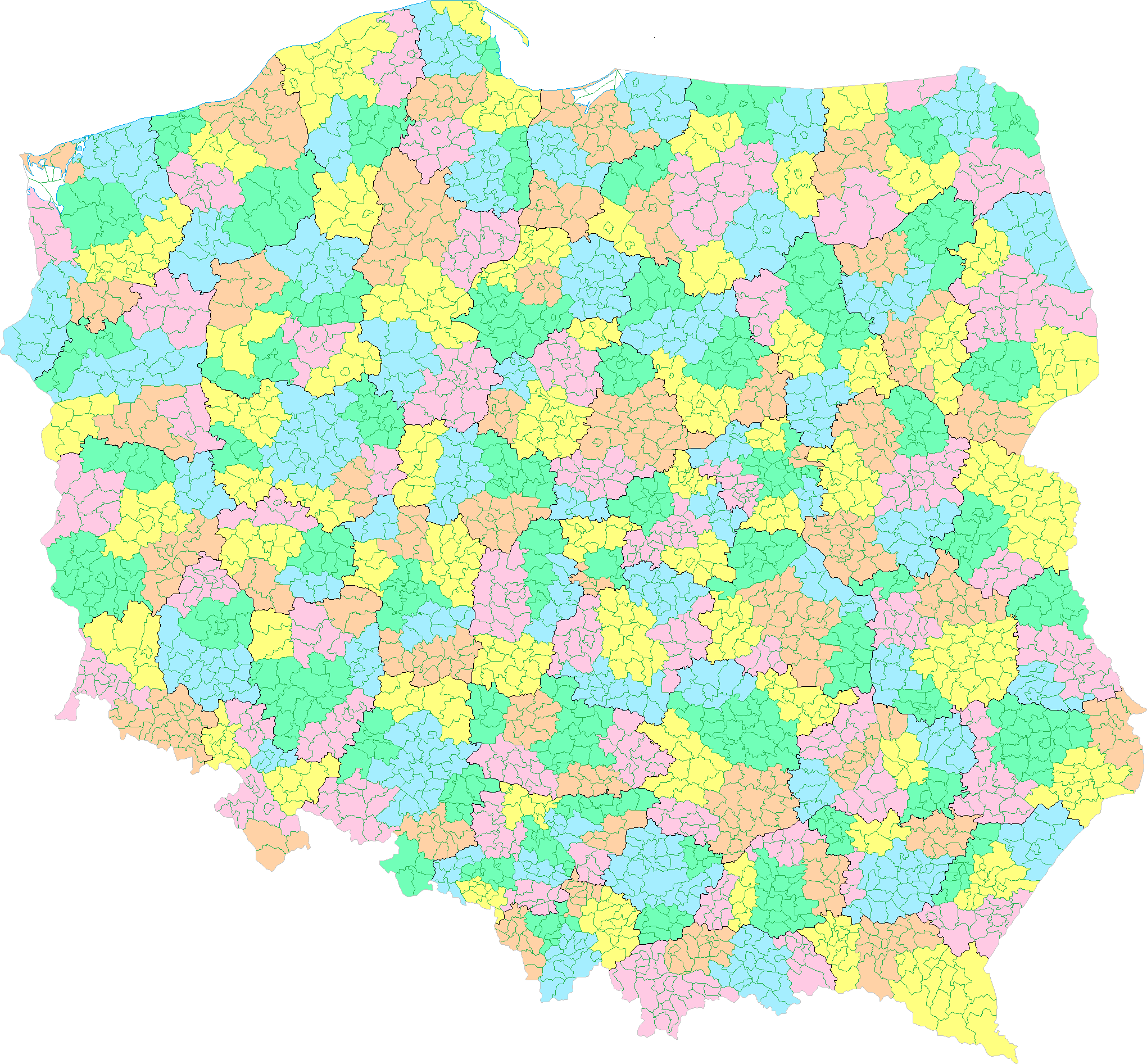
The district offices and gminas (municipalities) of Poland in 1998, including the Gdańsk Voivodeship.

In 1997, the voivodeship was divided into 63 gminas (municipalities), including 16 urban municipalities, 5 urban-rural municipalities, and 42 rural municipalities. It had 21 cities and towns.

From 1990 to 1998, it was additionally divided into eight district offices, each comprising several municipalities.

== Demographics ==
Year	Population
1975	1 249 300
1980	1 333 800
1985	1 401 500
1990	1 431 600
1995	1 455 900
1997	1 249 300

== Leaders ==
The leader of the administrative division was the voivode. Those were:

- 1975–1979: Henryk Śliwowski;
- 1979–1981: Jerzy Kołodziejski;
- 1981–1987: Mieczysław Cygan;
- 1988–1990: Jerzy Jędykiewicz;
- 1990–1996: Maciej Płażyński;
- 1996–1997: Henryk Wojciechowski;
- 1998: Tomasz Sowiński.
