= Piecewo, Pomeranian Voivodeship =

Piecewo
- Settlement
- Location within Poland
- Coordinates: 54°31′20″N 18°18′21″E
- Country: Poland
- Voivodeship: Pomeranian
- County: Wejherowo
- Gmina: Wejherowo

Piecewo [pjɛˈt͡sɛvɔ] (Kashubian: Piecewò) is a settlement in the administrative district of Gmina Wejherowo, within Wejherowo County, Pomeranian Voivodeship, in northern Poland. It belongs to the sołectwo of Bieszkowice.
