= Głodówko, Pomeranian Voivodeship =

Głodówko
- Settlement
- Location within Poland
- Coordinates: 54°30′29″N 18°22′20″E
- Country: Poland
- Voivodeship: Pomeranian
- County: Wejherowo
- Gmina: Wejherowo

Głodówko [ɡwɔˈdufkɔ] (Kashubian: Głodowkò) is a settlement in the administrative district of Gmina Wejherowo, within Wejherowo County, Pomeranian Voivodeship, in northern Poland. It belongs to the sołectwo of Łężyce.
