= Kielno, Pomeranian Voivodeship =

Kielno
- Village
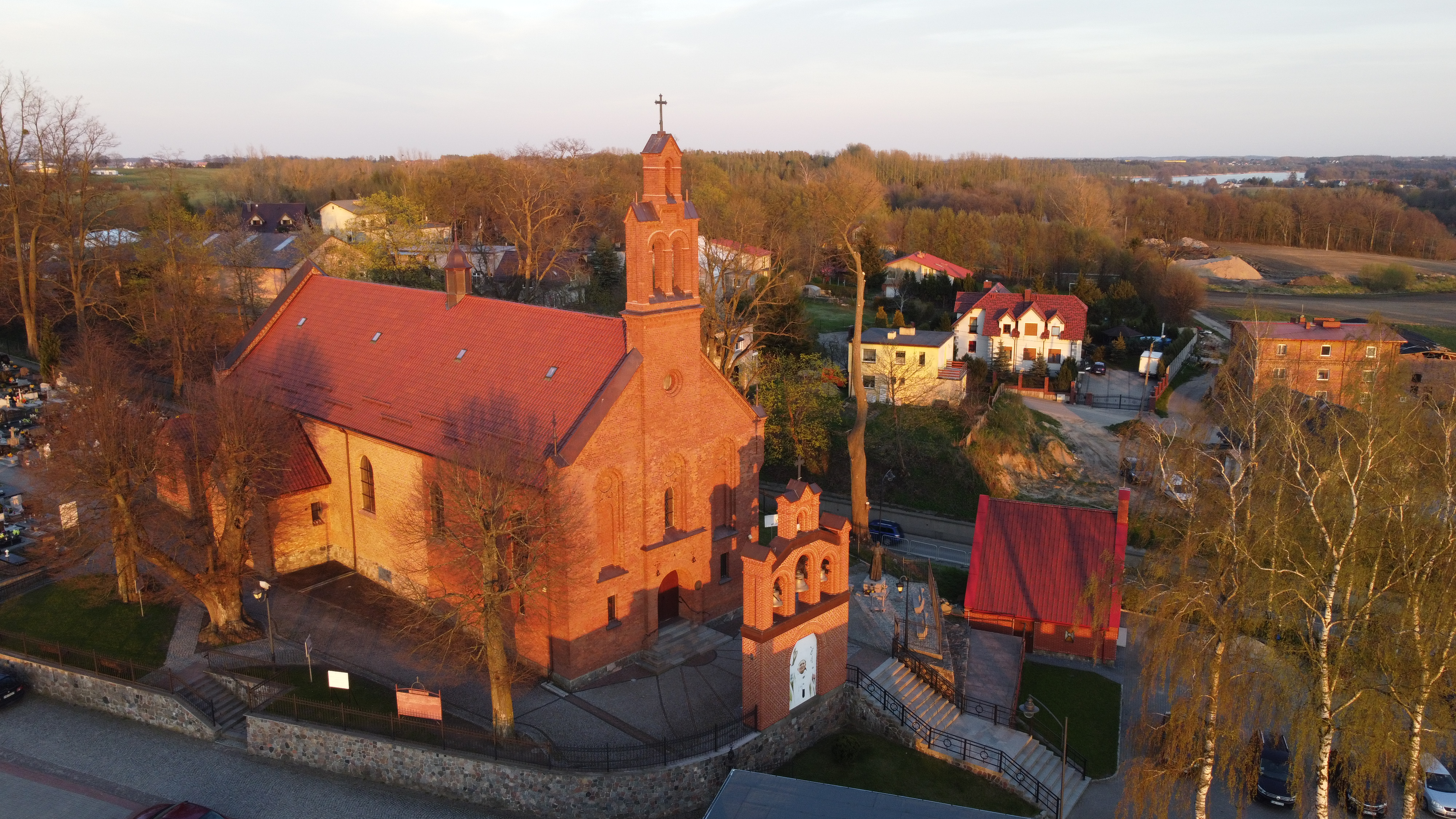
- Church of Saint Adalbert

- Location within Poland
- Coordinates: 54°27′10″N 18°20′15″E
- Country: Poland
- Voivodeship: Pomeranian
- County: Wejherowo
- Gmina: Szemud

Population
  - Total: 1,025
- Time zone: UTC+1 (CET)
  - Summer (DST): UTC+2 (CEST)
- Website: http://www.republika.pl/kielno/

Kielno [ˈkʲɛlnɔ] (Kashubian: Czelno, German: Kölln) is a village in the administrative district of Gmina Szemud, within Wejherowo County, Pomeranian Voivodeship, in northern Poland. It is located within the historic region of Pomerania.

Kielno was initially probably named Kolno. Kielno was a royal village of the Polish Crown, administratively located in the Gdańsk County in the Pomeranian Voivodeship. The local parish priest Zygmunt Niwicki was the royal secretary of 17th-century Polish kings.

Here was born the Kashubian poet Alojzy Nagel.
