= Nowiny, Wejherowo County =

Nowiny
- Settlement
- Location within Poland
- Coordinates: 54°34′20″N 18°17′28″E
- Country: Poland
- Voivodeship: Pomeranian
- County: Wejherowo
- Gmina: Wejherowo

Nowiny [nɔˈvinɨ] is a settlement in the administrative district of Gmina Wejherowo, within Wejherowo County, Pomeranian Voivodeship, in northern Poland.

For details of the history of the region, see History of Pomerania.
