= Biała, Wejherowo County =

Biała
- Settlement
- Location within Poland
- Coordinates: 54°34′4″N 18°14′36″E
- Country: Poland
- Voivodeship: Pomeranian
- County: Wejherowo
- Gmina: Wejherowo

Biała [ˈbjawa] is a settlement in the administrative district of Gmina Wejherowo, within Wejherowo County, Pomeranian Voivodeship, in northern Poland.

For details of the history of the region, see History of Pomerania.
