= Dobrzewino =

- Village
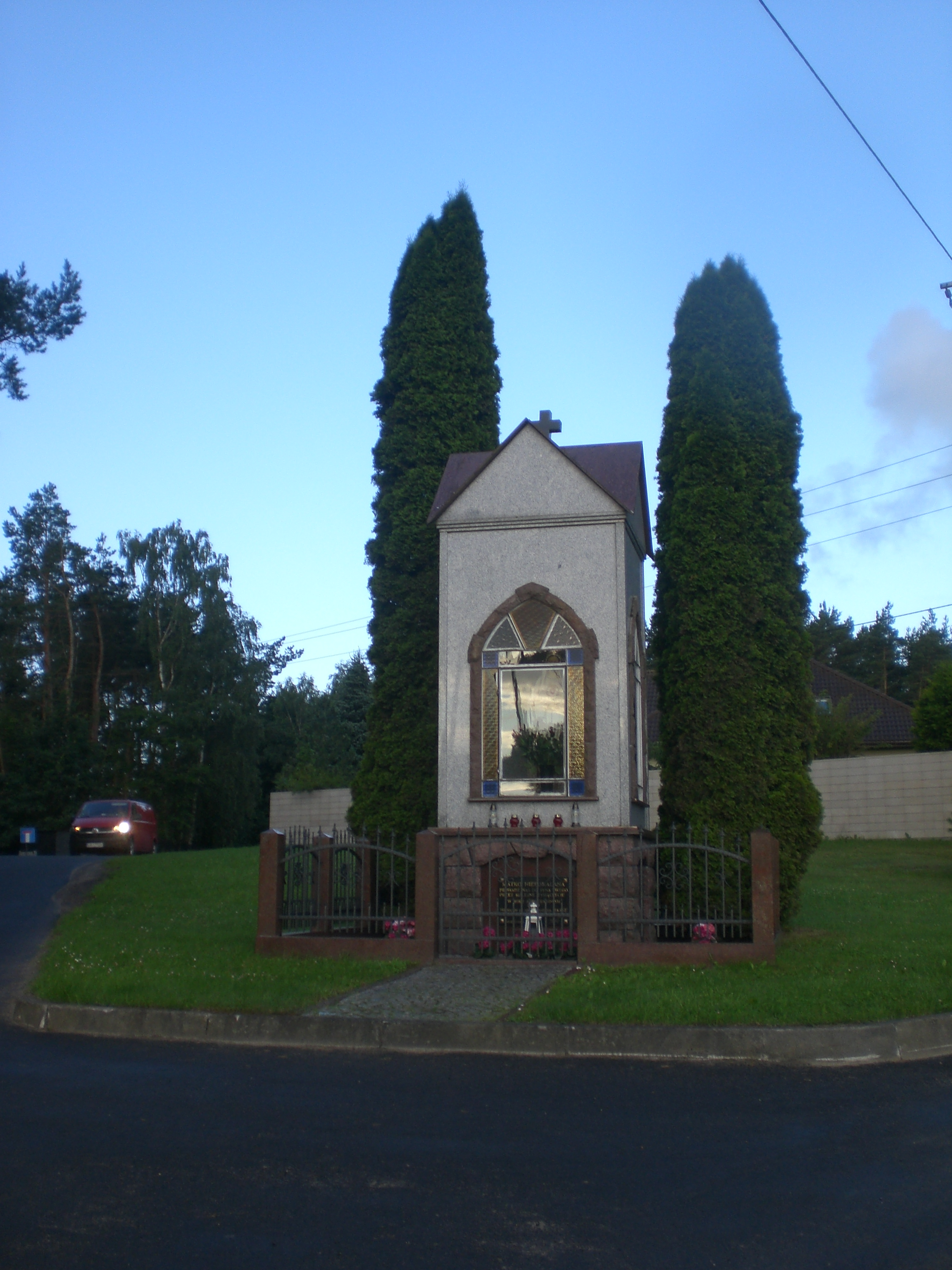
- Christian wayside shrine in Dobrzewino

- Location within Poland
- Coordinates: 54°27′16″N 18°23′24″E
- Country: Poland
- Voivodeship: Pomeranian
- County: Wejherowo
- Gmina: Szemud

Population
  - Total: 863
- Time zone: UTC+1 (CET)
  - Summer (DST): UTC+2 (CEST)
- Vehicle registration: GWE

Dobrzewino [dɔbʐɛˈvinɔ] is a village in the administrative district of Gmina Szemud, within Wejherowo County, Pomeranian Voivodeship, in northern Poland. It is located in the ethnocultural region of Kashubia in the historical region of Pomerania.

== History ==
Dobrzewino was a private village of Polish nobility, including the Klawiński, Maczkowicz, Dobrzewiński and Marika families, administratively located in the Gdańsk County in the Pomeranian Voivodeship of the Kingdom of Poland.
