= Grabowiec, Wejherowo County =

Grabowiec
- Village
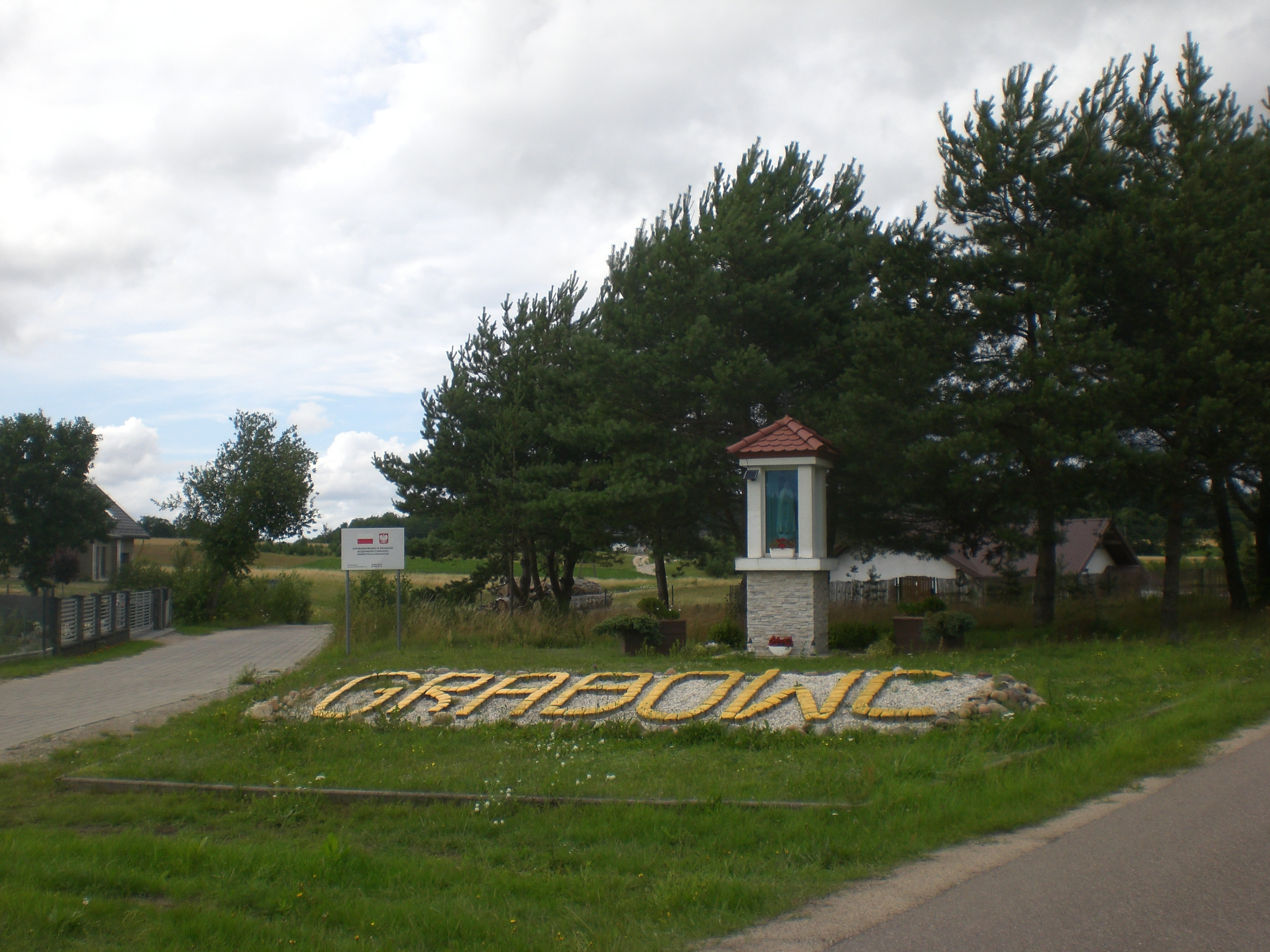

- Location within Poland
- Coordinates: 54°30′4″N 18°14′58″E
- Country: Poland
- Voivodeship: Pomeranian
- County: Wejherowo
- Gmina: Szemud
- Population: 179

Grabowiec ([ɡraˈbɔvjɛt͡s]) is a village in the administrative district of Gmina Szemud, within Wejherowo County, Pomeranian Voivodeship, in northern Poland.

For details of the history of the region, see History of Pomerania.
