= Białasowizna =

Village in Wejherowo, Pomeranian Voivodeship, Poland

- Village
- Location within Poland
- Coordinates: 54°36′28″N 18°9′3″E
- Country: Poland
- Voivodeship: Pomeranian
- County: Wejherowo
- Gmina: Wejherowo

Białasowizna [bjawasɔˈvizna] is a village in the administrative district of Gmina Wejherowo, within Wejherowo County, Pomeranian Voivodeship, in northern Poland.

For details of the history of the region, see History of Pomerania.
