= Karczemki, Pomeranian Voivodeship =

Karczemki
- Village
- Location within Poland
- Coordinates: 54°26′43″N 18°23′13″E
- Country: Poland
- Voivodeship: Pomeranian
- County: Wejherowo
- Gmina: Szemud

Karczemki [karˈt͡ʂɛmki] is a village in the administrative district of Gmina Szemud, within Wejherowo County, Pomeranian Voivodeship, in northern Poland.

For details of the history of the region, see History of Pomerania.
