= Leśno, Wejherowo County =

Village in Kashubia

Leśno Lesno
- Village
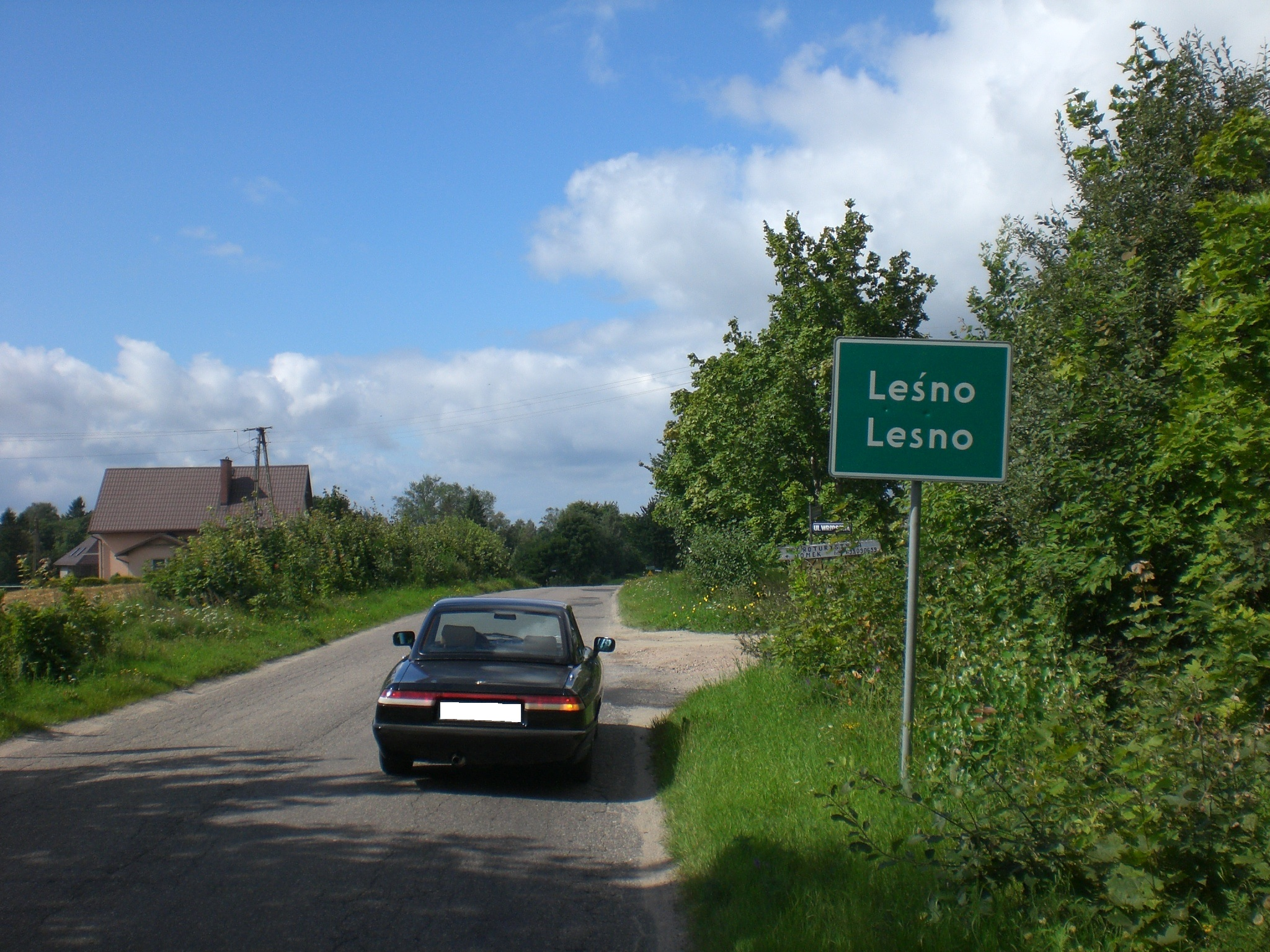

- Location within Poland
- Coordinates: 54°26′39″N 18°17′54″E
- Country: Poland
- Voivodeship: Pomeranian
- County: Wejherowo
- Gmina: Szemud
- Population: 478

Leśno [ˈlɛɕnɔ] (Kashubian: Lesno) is a village in the administrative district of Gmina Szemud, within Wejherowo County, Pomeranian Voivodeship, in northern Poland.

For details of the history of the region, see History of Pomerania.
