= Dębowa, Pomeranian Voivodeship =

Dębowa
- Village
- Location within Poland
- Coordinates: 54°27′27″N 18°22′14″E
- Country: Poland
- Voivodeship: Pomeranian
- County: Wejherowo
- Gmina: Szemud

Dębowa [dɛmˈbɔva] is a village in the administrative district of Gmina Szemud, within Wejherowo County, Pomeranian Voivodeship, in northern Poland.

For details of the history of the region, see History of Pomerania.
