= Małe Gowino =

- Village
- Location within Poland
- Coordinates: 54°34′32″N 18°12′3″E
- Country: Poland
- Voivodeship: Pomeranian
- County: Wejherowo
- Gmina: Wejherowo
- Population: 310

Małe Gowino [ˈmawɛ ɡɔˈvinɔ] is a village in the administrative district of Gmina Wejherowo, within Wejherowo County, Pomeranian Voivodeship, in northern Poland.

For details of the history of the region, see History of Pomerania.
