= Nowy Dwór Wejherowski =

Village in Kashubia

Nowy Dwór Wejherowski Nowi Dwór Wejrowsczi
- Village
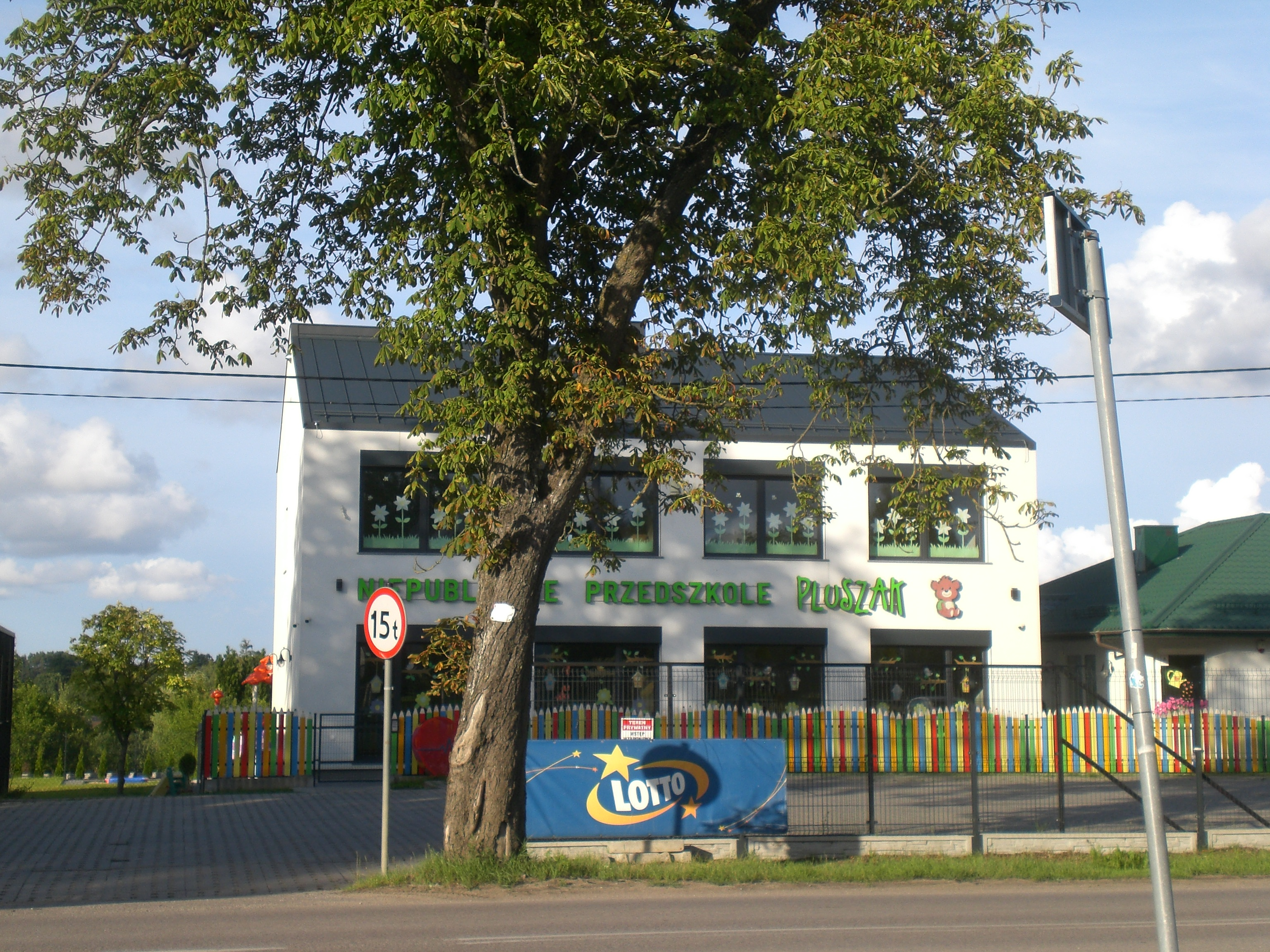

- Location within Poland
- Coordinates: 54°32′31″N 18°17′18″E
- Country: Poland
- Voivodeship: Pomeranian
- County: Wejherowo
- Gmina: Wejherowo
- Population: 432

Nowy Dwór Wejherowski [ˈnɔvɨ ˈdvur vɛi̯xɛˈrɔfski] (Kashubian: Nowi Dwór Wejrowsczi) is a village in the administrative district of Gmina Wejherowo, within Wejherowo County, Pomeranian Voivodeship, in northern Poland.

For details of the history of the region, see History of Pomerania.
