= Ustarbowo =

Village in Kashubia

Ustarbowo Ùstôrbòwò
- Village
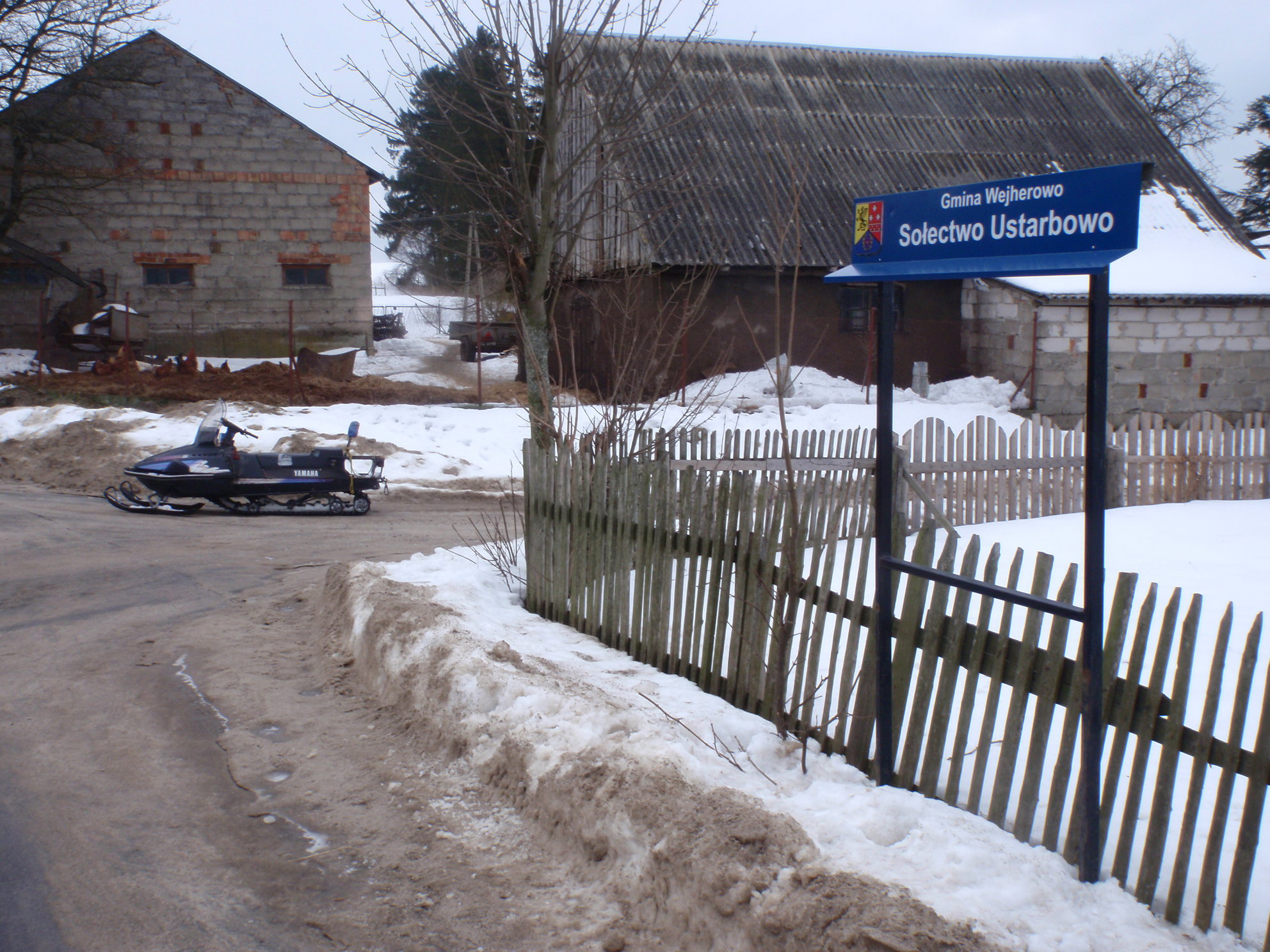

- Location within Poland
- Coordinates: 54°33′6″N 18°12′14″E
- Country: Poland
- Voivodeship: Pomeranian
- County: Wejherowo
- Gmina: Wejherowo
- Population: 220

Ustarbowo [ustarˈbɔvɔ] (Kashubian: Ùstôrbòwò) is a village in the administrative district of Gmina Wejherowo, within Wejherowo County, Pomeranian Voivodeship, in northern Poland.

For details of the history of the region, see History of Pomerania.
