= Orle railway station =

Railway station in Wejherowo County, Poland

Coordinates: 54°37′47″N 18°10′32″E

Orle

General information
- Location: Orle; Poland
- Owner: Polskie Koleje Państwowe S.A.
- Platforms: None

Construction
- Structure type: Building: No; Depot: No; Water tower: No
Location

Orle is a non-operational PKP railway station on the disused PKP rail line 230 in Orle (Pomeranian Voivodeship), Poland.

== Lines crossing the station ==
Start station	End station	Line type
Wejherowo	Garczegorze	Closed
