= Gwizdówka =

Village in Kashubia

Gwizdówka Pùrgaczka
- Village
- Country: Poland
- Voivodeship: Pomeranian
- County: Wejherowo
- Gmina: Wejherowo

Gwizdówka [ɡvizˈdufka] (Kashubian: Pùrgaczka) is a village in the administrative district of Gmina Wejherowo, within Wejherowo County, Pomeranian Voivodeship, in northern Poland.

For details of the history of the region, see History of Pomerania.
