= Warzno =

- Village
- Location within Poland
- Coordinates: 54°26′21″N 18°20′40″E
- Country: Poland
- Voivodeship: Pomeranian
- County: Wejherowo
- Gmina: Szemud
- Population: 314

Warzno [ˈvaʐnɔ] is a village in the administrative district of Gmina Szemud, within Wejherowo County, Pomeranian Voivodeship, in northern Poland.

For details of the history of the region, see History of Pomerania.
