= Bagielnica =

- Settlement
- Location within Poland
- Coordinates: 54°25′7″N 18°7′10″E
- Country: Poland
- Voivodeship: Pomeranian
- County: Wejherowo
- Gmina: Szemud
- Population: 16

Bagielnica [baɡʲɛlˈnit͡sa] is a settlement in the administrative district of Gmina Szemud, within Wejherowo County, Pomeranian Voivodeship, in northern Poland.

For details of the history of the region, see History of Pomerania.
