= Kąpino =

- Village
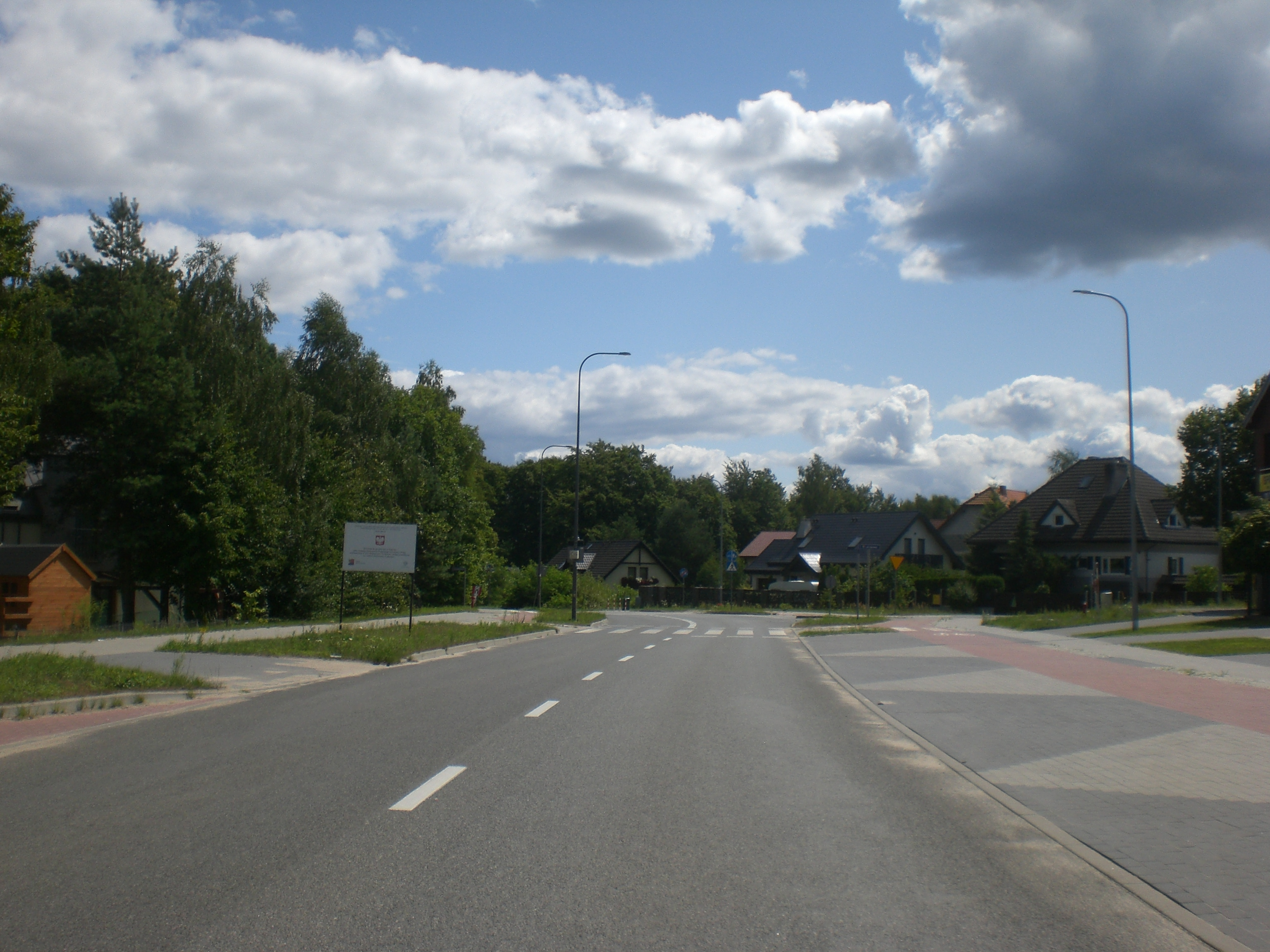

- Location within Poland
- Coordinates: 54°37′48″N 18°15′16″E
- Country: Poland
- Voivodeship: Pomeranian
- County: Wejherowo
- Gmina: Wejherowo
- Population: 814

Kąpino [kɔmˈpinɔ] is a village in the administrative district of Gmina Wejherowo, within Wejherowo County, Pomeranian Voivodeship, in northern Poland.

For details of the history of the region, see History of Pomerania.
