= Kamień, Wejherowo County =

Kamień
- Village
- Location within Poland
- Coordinates: 54°28′37″N 18°16′14″E
- Country: Poland
- Voivodeship: Pomeranian
- County: Wejherowo
- Gmina: Szemud
- Population: 478

Kamień (Polish pronunciation: [ˈkamjɛj̃]) is a village in the administrative district of Gmina Szemud, within Wejherowo County, Pomeranian Voivodeship, in northern Poland.

For details of the history of the region, see History of Pomerania.
