= Gapionka =

- Settlement
- Location within Poland
- Coordinates: 54°26′37″N 18°11′40″E
- Country: Poland
- Voivodeship: Pomeranian
- County: Wejherowo
- Gmina: Szemud

Gapionka [ɡaˈpjɔnka] is a settlement in the administrative district of Gmina Szemud, within Wejherowo County, Pomeranian Voivodeship, in northern Poland.

For details of the history of the region, see History of Pomerania.
