= Prymków =

- Settlement
- Location within Poland
- Coordinates: 54°41′6″N 18°7′5″E
- Country: Poland
- Voivodeship: Pomeranian
- County: Wejherowo
- Gmina: Wejherowo

Prymków [ˈprɨmkuf] is a settlement in the administrative district of Gmina Wejherowo, within Wejherowo County, Pomeranian Voivodeship, in northern Poland.

For details of the history of the region, see History of Pomerania.
