= Warszkowski Młyn =

Settlement in Kashubia

Warszkowski Młyn Warszkòwsczi Młën
- Hamlet
- Location within Poland
- Coordinates: 54°41′28″N 18°9′14″E
- Country: Poland
- Voivodeship: Pomeranian
- County: Wejherowo
- Gmina: Wejherowo

Warszkowski Młyn [varʂˈkɔfski ˈmwɨn] (Kashubian: Warszkòwsczi Młën) is a settlement in the administrative district of Gmina Wejherowo, within Wejherowo County, Pomeranian Voivodeship, in northern Poland.

For details of the history of the region, see History of Pomerania.
