= Zbychowo =

Village in Kashubia

Zbychowo Zbichòwò
- Village
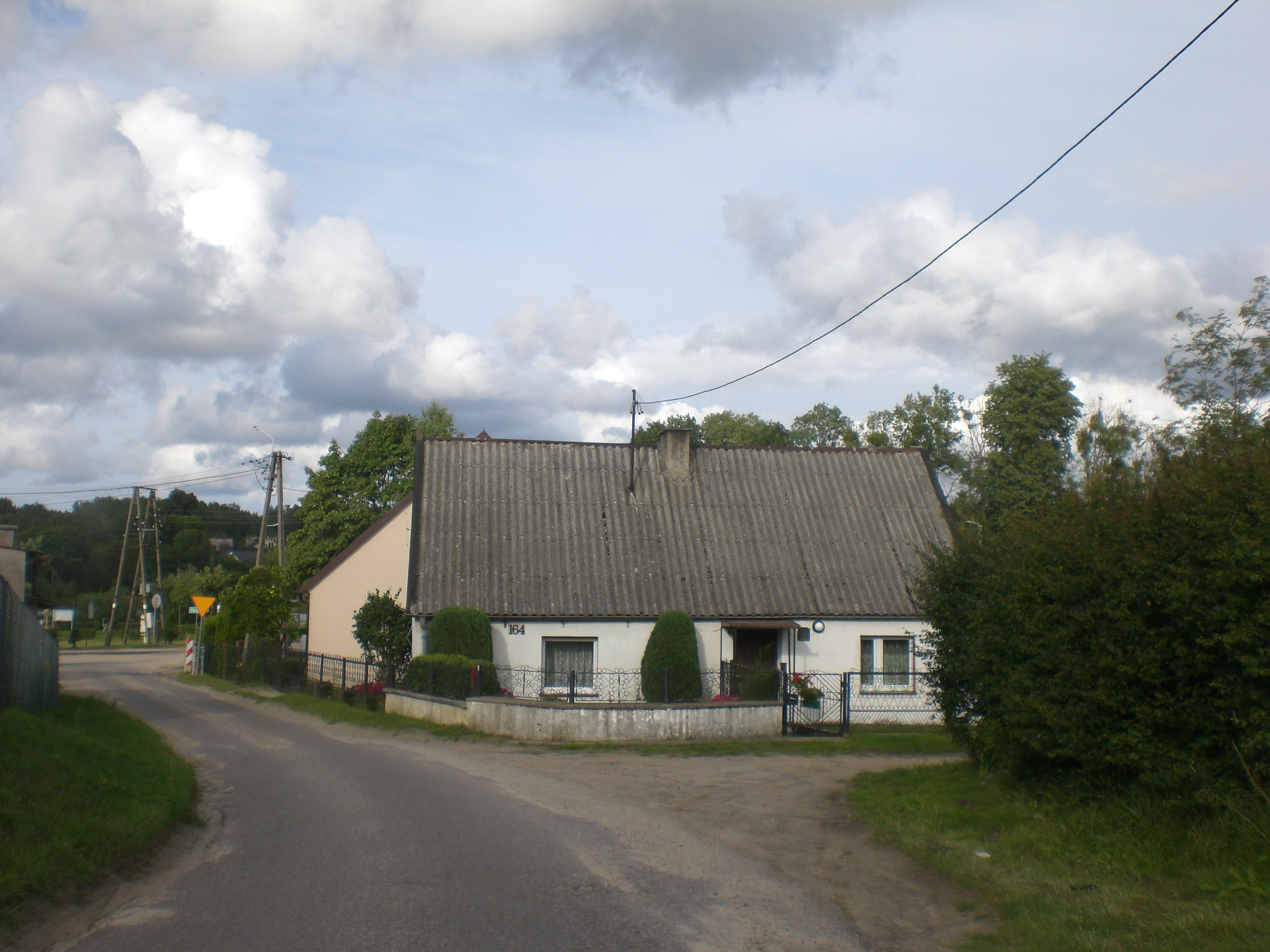

- Location within Poland
- Coordinates: 54°33′18″N 18°19′16″E
- Country: Poland
- Voivodeship: Pomeranian
- County: Wejherowo
- Gmina: Wejherowo
- Population: 489
- Website: http://zbychowo.webpark.pl/index.html

Zbychowo [zbɨˈxɔvɔ] (Kashubian: Zbichòwò) is a village in the administrative district of Gmina Wejherowo, within Wejherowo County, Pomeranian Voivodeship, in northern Poland.

For details of the history of the region, see History of Pomerania.
