= Czarna Góra, Wejherowo County =

Czarna Góra
- Settlement
- Location within Poland
- Coordinates: 54°28′53″N 18°21′46″E
- Country: Poland
- Voivodeship: Pomeranian
- County: Wejherowo
- Gmina: Szemud

Czarna Góra [ˈt͡ʂarna ˈɡura] is a settlement in the administrative district of Gmina Szemud, within Wejherowo County, Pomeranian Voivodeship, in northern Poland.

For details of the history of the region, see History of Pomerania.
