= Wygoda, Wejherowo County =

Settlement in Kashubia

Wygoda Wëgòda
- Przysiółek
- Location within Poland
- Coordinates: 54°31′37″N 18°14′43″E
- Country: Poland
- Voivodeship: Pomeranian
- County: Wejherowo
- Gmina: Wejherowo

Wygoda [vɨˈɡɔda] ((Kashubian: Wëgòda) is a przysiółek in the administrative district of Gmina Wejherowo, within Wejherowo County, Pomeranian Voivodeship, in northern Poland.

For details of the history of the region, see History of Pomerania.
