= Czarna Dąbrowa, Wejherowo County =

Czarna Dąbrowa
- Settlement
- Location within Poland
- Coordinates: 54°30′26″N 18°12′14″E
- Country: Poland
- Voivodeship: Pomeranian
- County: Wejherowo
- Gmina: Szemud

Czarna Dąbrowa [ˈt͡ʂarna dɔmˈbrɔva] is a settlement in the administrative district of Gmina Szemud, within Wejherowo County, Pomeranian Voivodeship, in northern Poland.

For details of the history of the region, see History of Pomerania.
