= Łebieńska Huta =

- Village
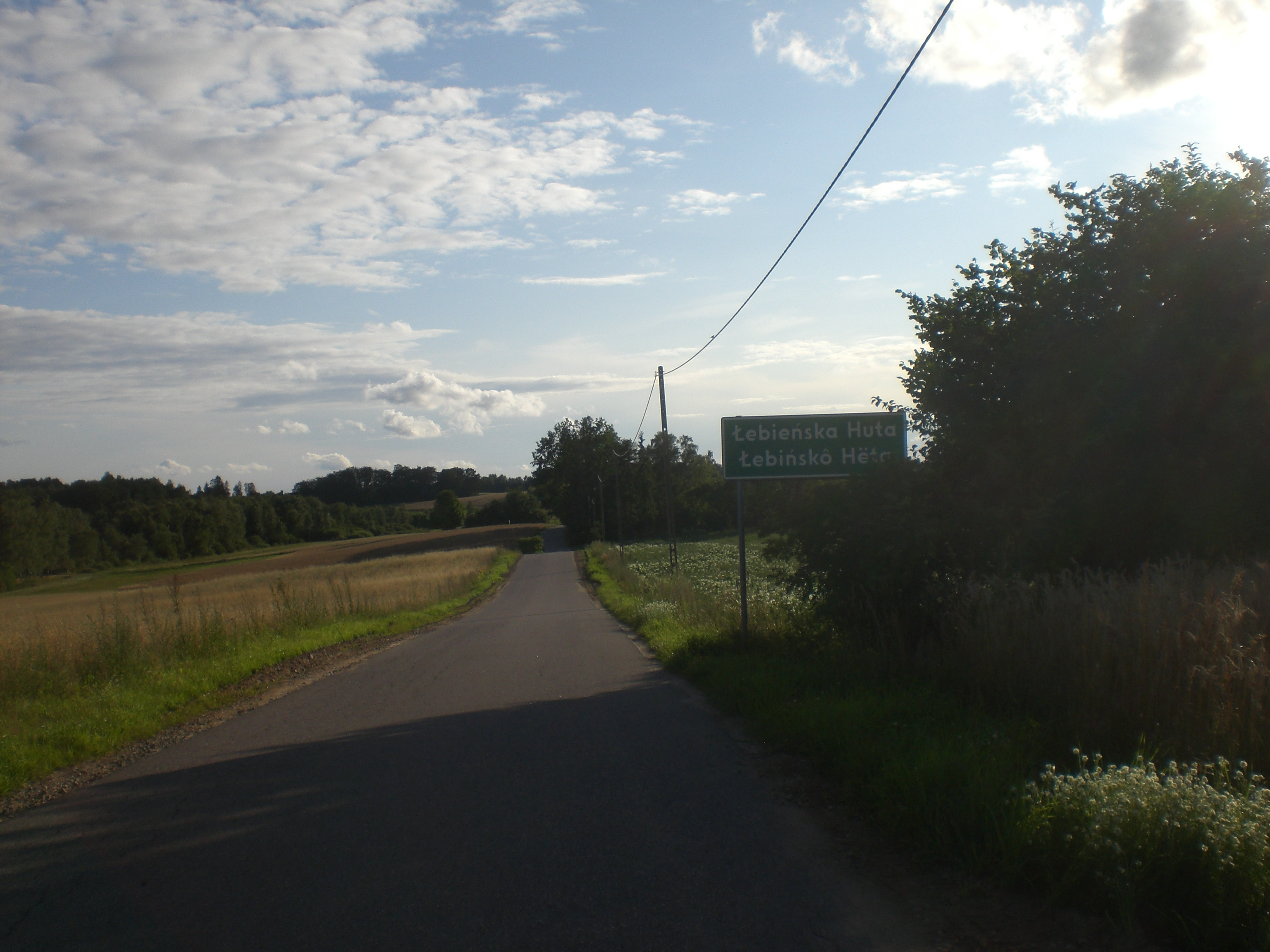

- Location within Poland
- Coordinates: 54°26′15″N 18°10′6″E
- Country: Poland
- Voivodeship: Pomeranian
- County: Wejherowo
- Gmina: Szemud
- Population: 425

Łebieńska Huta [wɛˈbʲɛɲska ˈxuta] is a village in the administrative district of Gmina Szemud, within Wejherowo County, Pomeranian Voivodeship, in northern Poland.

For details of the history of the region, see History of Pomerania.
