= Sopieszyno-Wybudowanie =

- Village
- Location within Poland
- Coordinates: 54°32′43″N 18°14′37″E
- Country: Poland
- Voivodeship: Pomeranian
- County: Wejherowo
- Gmina: Wejherowo

Sopieszyno-Wybudowanie [sɔpjɛˈʂɨnɔ vɨbudɔˈvaɲɛ] is a village in the administrative district of Gmina Wejherowo, within Wejherowo County, Pomeranian Voivodeship, in northern Poland.

For details of the history of the region, see History of Pomerania.
