= Szemudzka Huta =

- Village
- Location within Poland
- Coordinates: 54°28′2″N 18°13′38″E
- Country: Poland
- Voivodeship: Pomeranian
- County: Wejherowo
- Gmina: Szemud
- Population: 225

Szemudzka Huta [ʂɛˈmut͡ska ˈxuta] is a village in the administrative district of Gmina Szemud, within Wejherowo County, Pomeranian Voivodeship, in northern Poland.

For details of the history of the region, see History of Pomerania.
