= Pętkowice, Pomeranian Voivodeship =

Settlement in Kashubia

Pętkowice Pãtkòwice
- Hamlet
- Location within Poland
- Coordinates: 54°35′2″N 18°12′40″E
- Country: Poland
- Voivodeship: Pomeranian
- County: Wejherowo
- Gmina: Wejherowo
- Population: 355

Pętkowice [pɛntkɔˈvit͡sɛ] (Kashubian: Pãtkòwice) is a hamlet in the administrative district of Gmina Wejherowo, within Wejherowo County, Pomeranian Voivodeship, in northern Poland.

For details of the history of the region, see History of Pomerania.
