= Miga =

Miga may refer to:

== Places ==
- Miga, Nigeria, a Local Government Area of Jigawa State
- Miga, Poland, a village

== People and characters ==
- Karen Miga, American geneticist
- Miga (mascot), a mascot of the 2010 Winter Olympic Games

== Acronyms ==
- Multilateral Investment Guarantee Agency, an organization within the World Bank Group
- Variations of the "Make America Great Again" slogan:
  - Make India Great Again
  - Make Indonesia Great Again
  - Make Iran Great Again
  - Make Israel Great Again
