= Głazica =

- Village
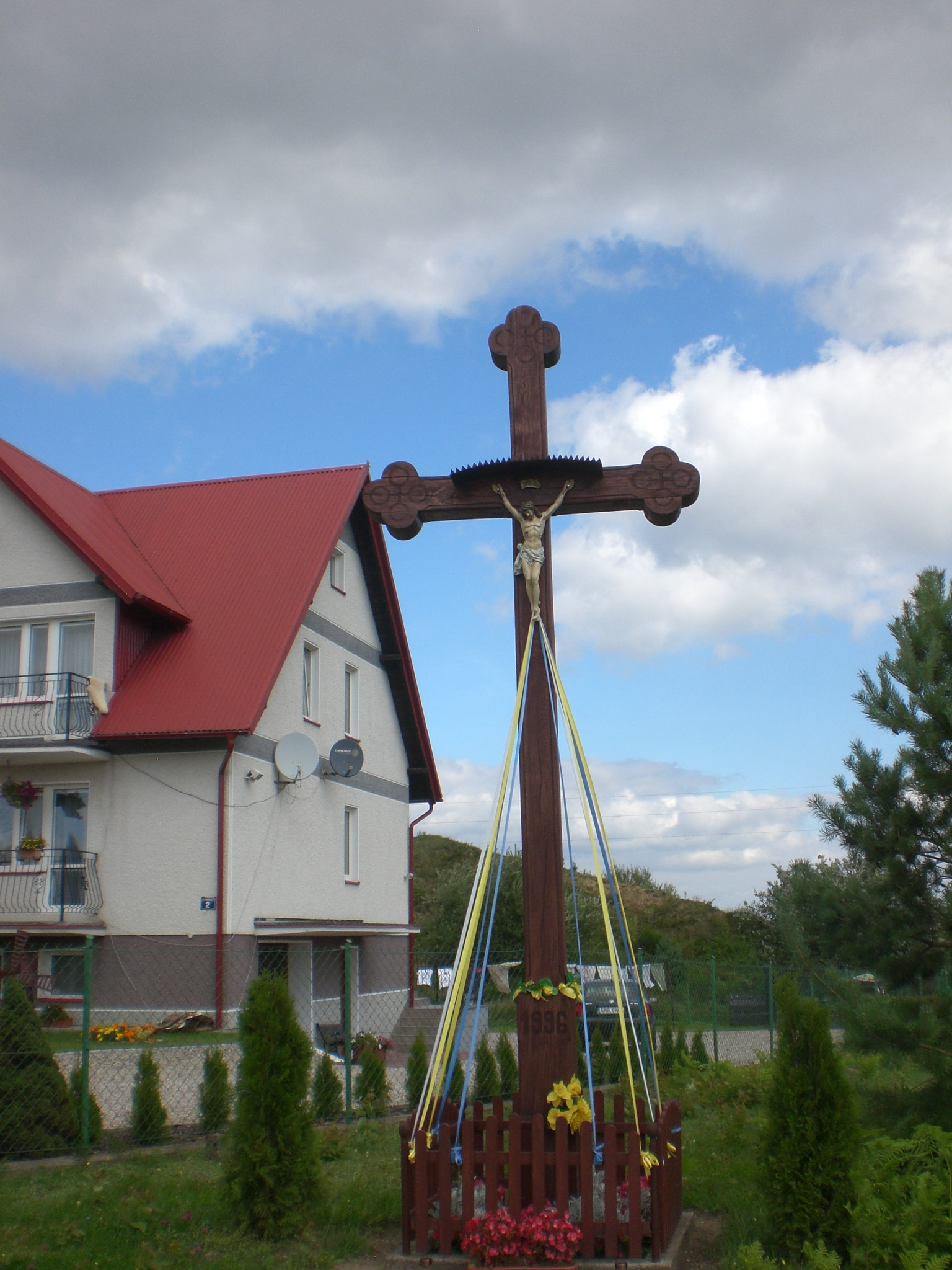
- Wayside cross in Głazica

- Location within Poland
- Coordinates: 54°29′46″N 18°11′32″E
- Country: Poland
- Voivodeship: Pomeranian
- County: Wejherowo
- Gmina: Szemud
- Population: 192
- Time zone: UTC+1 (CET)
  - Summer (DST): UTC+2 (CEST)
- Vehicle registration: GWE

Głazica [ɡwaˈʑit͡sa] is a village in the administrative district of Gmina Szemud, within Wejherowo County, Pomeranian Voivodeship, in northern Poland. It is located within the ethnocultural region of Kashubia in the historic region of Pomerania.

== History ==
Głazica was a royal village of the Polish Crown, administratively located in the Puck County in the Pomeranian Voivodeship.

During the German occupation of Poland (World War II), in 1940, several Polish families were expelled, while their farms were handed over to German colonists as part of the Lebensraum policy.
