= Marianowo, Pomeranian Voivodeship =

Marianowo
- Village
- Location within Poland
- Coordinates: 54°34′39″N 18°18′38″E
- Country: Poland
- Voivodeship: Pomeranian
- County: Wejherowo
- Gmina: Wejherowo

Marianowo [marjaˈnɔvɔ] is a village in the administrative district of Gmina Wejherowo, within Wejherowo County, Pomeranian Voivodeship, in northern Poland.

For details of the history of the region, see History of Pomerania.
