= Rębiska =

- Village
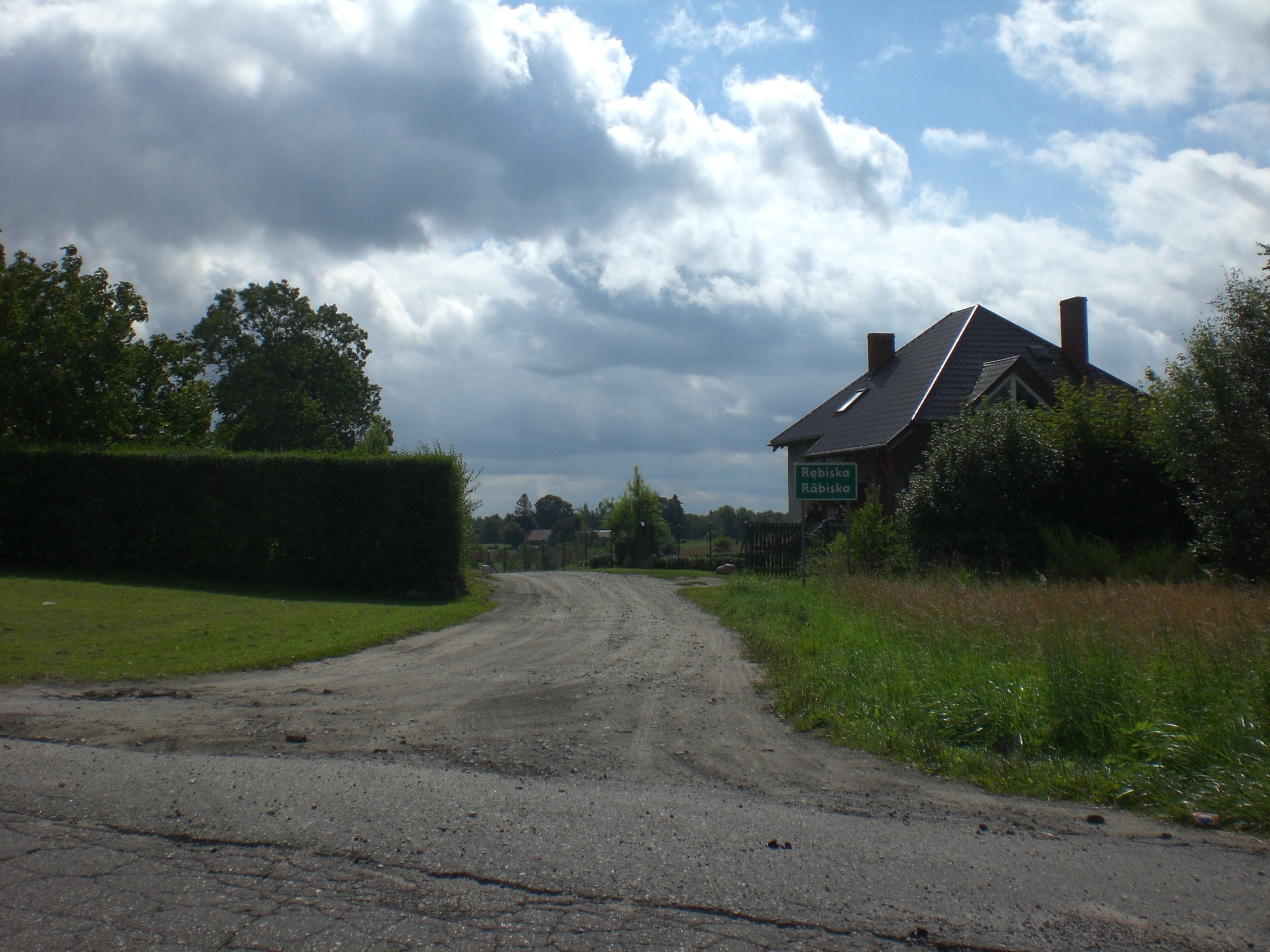

- Location within Poland
- Coordinates: 54°26′32″N 18°19′25″E
- Country: Poland
- Voivodeship: Pomeranian
- County: Wejherowo
- Gmina: Szemud
- Population: 305

Rębiska [rɛmˈbiska] is a village in the administrative district of Gmina Szemud, within Wejherowo County, Pomeranian Voivodeship, in northern Poland.

For details of the history of the region, see History of Pomerania.
