= Częstkowo, Wejherowo County =

Częstkowo
- Village
- Location within Poland
- Coordinates: 54°30′7″N 18°8′49″E
- Country: Poland
- Voivodeship: Pomeranian
- County: Wejherowo
- Gmina: Szemud
- Population: 555

Częstkowo [t͡ʂɛ̃stˈkɔvɔ] is a village in the administrative district of Gmina Szemud, within Wejherowo County, Pomeranian Voivodeship, in northern Poland.

For details of the history of the region, see History of Pomerania.
