= Donimierz, Pomeranian Voivodeship =

Donimierz
- Village
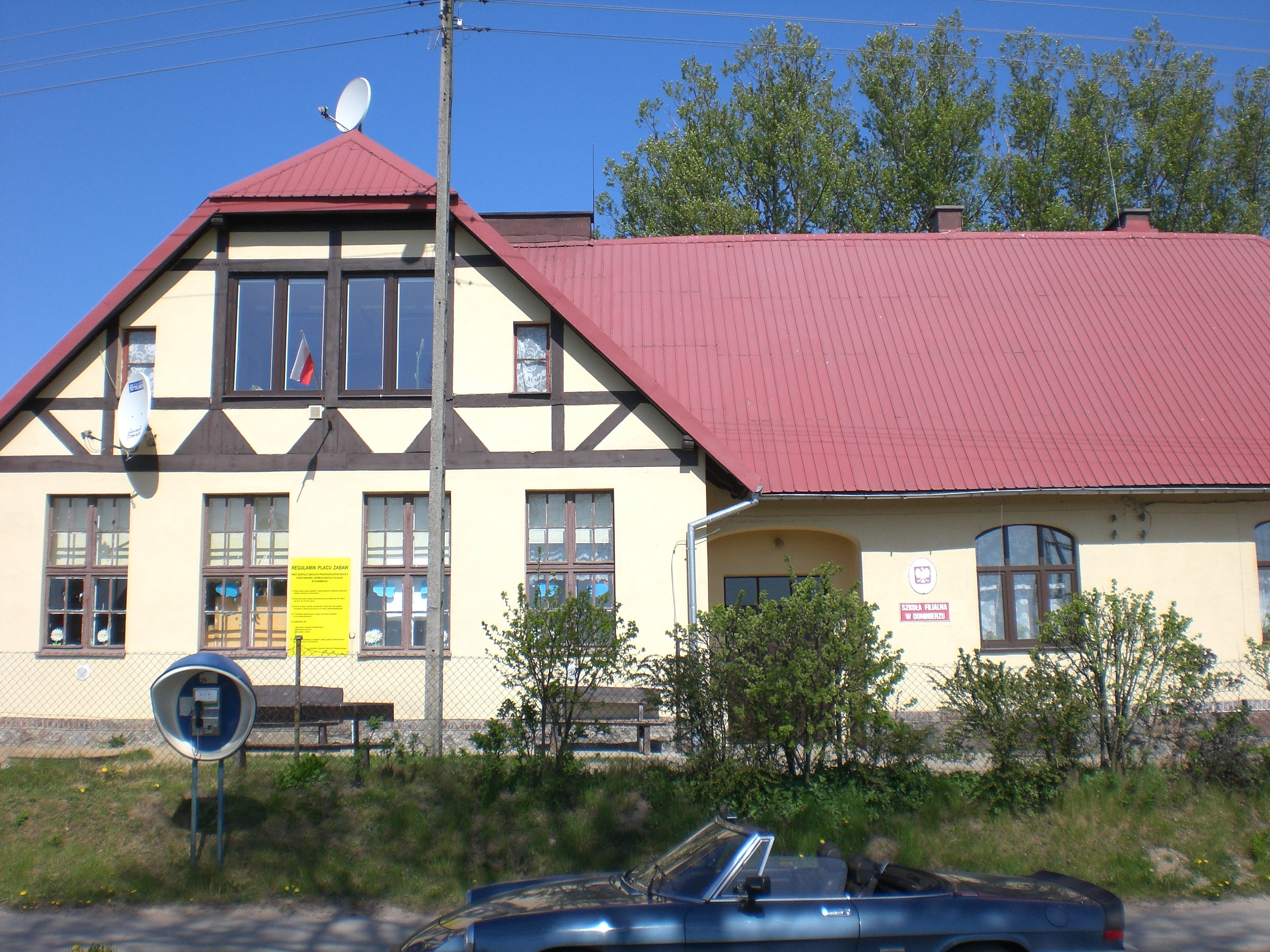
- School in the village

- Location within Poland
- Coordinates: 54°28′42″N 18°11′22″E
- Country: Poland
- Voivodeship: Pomeranian
- County: Wejherowo
- Gmina: Szemud

Population
  - Total: 707

Donimierz [dɔˈnimjɛʂ] (Kashubian: Dolmiérz) is a village in the administrative district of Gmina Szemud, within Wejherowo County, Pomeranian Voivodeship, in northern Poland.

For details of the history of the region, see History of Pomerania.
