= Paradyż =

Paradyż may refer to the following places in Poland:

- Paradyż, Opoczno County in Łódź Voivodeship (central Poland)
- Paradyż, Pomeranian Voivodeship (north Poland)
- Paradyż, former name of Gościkowo in Lubusz Voivodeship (west Poland)
