= Bojano, Pomeranian Voivodeship =

Bojano
- Village
- Location within Poland
- Coordinates: 54°28′23″N 18°23′4″E
- Country: Poland
- Voivodeship: Pomeranian
- County: Wejherowo
- Gmina: Szemud
- Population (approx.): 3,000

Bojano [bɔˈjanɔ] is a village in the administrative district of Gmina Szemud, within Wejherowo County, Pomeranian Voivodeship, in northern Poland.

For details of the history of the region, see History of Pomerania.
