= Kotłówka, Pomeranian Voivodeship =

Kotłówka
- Settlement
- Location within Poland
- Coordinates: 54°33′4″N 18°14′15″E
- Country: Poland
- Voivodeship: Pomeranian
- County: Wejherowo
- Gmina: Wejherowo
- Time zone: UTC+1 (CET)
  - Summer (DST): UTC+2 (CEST)

Kotłówka [kɔˈtwufka] is a settlement in the administrative district of Gmina Wejherowo, within Wejherowo County, Pomeranian Voivodeship, in northern Poland. It is located in the ethnocultural region of Kashubia in the historic region of Pomerania.
