= Łebno =

- Village
- Location within Poland
- Coordinates: 54°27′42″N 18°8′25″E
- Country: Poland
- Voivodeship: Pomeranian
- County: Wejherowo
- Gmina: Szemud
- Population: 974

Łebno [ˈwɛbnɔ] is a village in the administrative district of Gmina Szemud, within Wejherowo County, Pomeranian Voivodeship, in northern Poland.

For details of the history of the region, see History of Pomerania.
