= Nowa Karczma, Wejherowo County =

Nowa Karczma
- Village
- Location within Poland
- Coordinates: 54°27′50″N 18°15′39″E
- Country: Poland
- Voivodeship: Pomeranian
- County: Wejherowo
- Gmina: Szemud

Nowa Karczma [ˈnɔva ˈkart͡ʂma] is a village in the administrative district of Gmina Szemud, within Wejherowo County, Pomeranian Voivodeship, in northern Poland.

For details of the history of the region, see History of Pomerania.
