= Jeleńska Huta =

- Village
- Location within Poland
- Coordinates: 54°27′9″N 18°13′45″E
- Country: Poland
- Voivodeship: Pomeranian
- County: Wejherowo
- Gmina: Szemud
- Population: 300

Jeleńska Huta [jɛˈlɛɲska ˈxuta] is a village in the administrative district of Gmina Szemud, within Wejherowo County, Pomeranian Voivodeship, in northern Poland.

== See also ==
- History of Pomerania
