= Gniewowo, Pomeranian Voivodeship =

Gniewowo
- Village
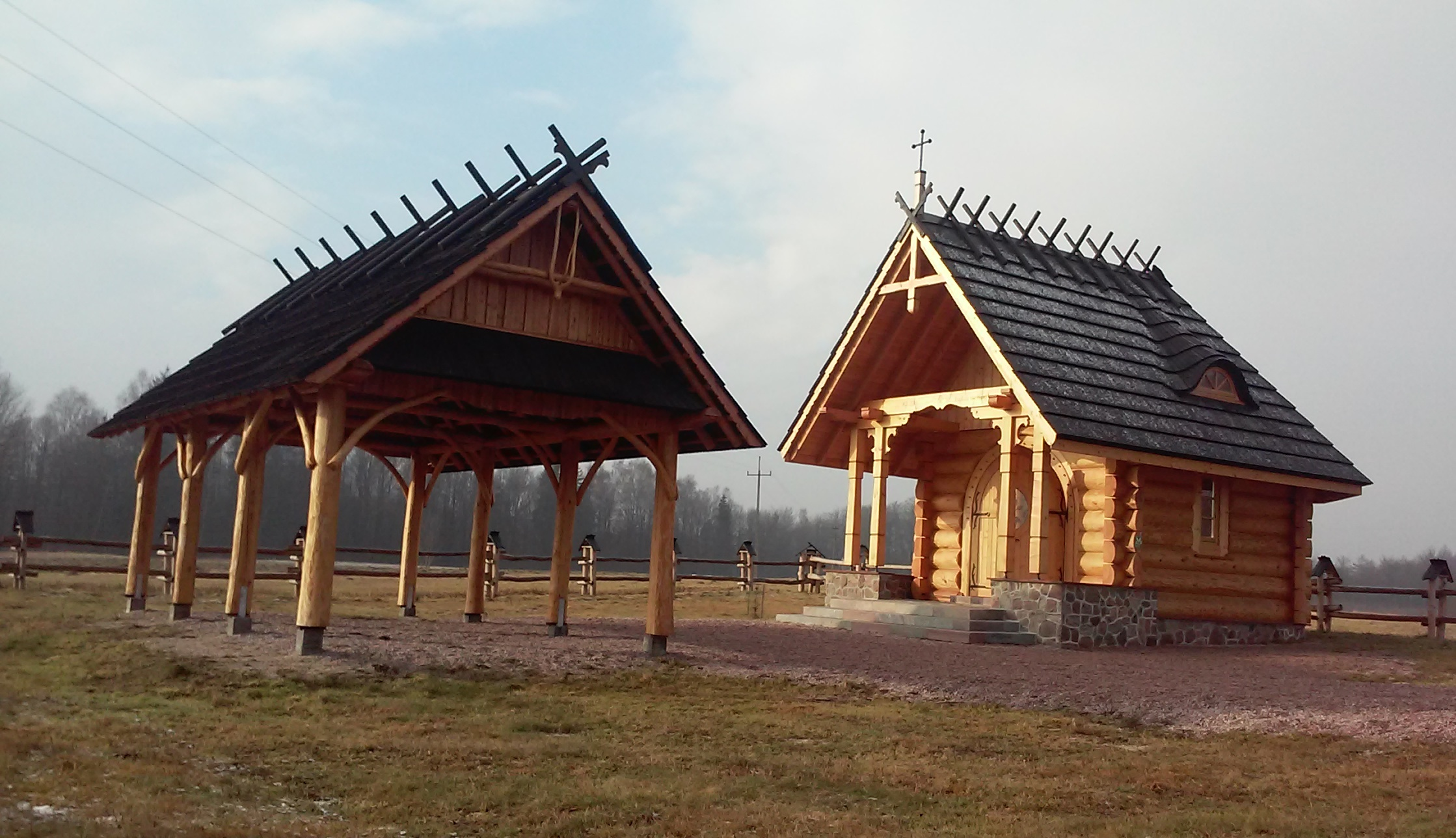
- St. Hubertus Chapel in Gniewowo

- Location within Poland
- Coordinates: 54°34′26″N 18°18′32″E
- Country: Poland
- Voivodeship: Pomeranian
- County: Wejherowo
- Gmina: Wejherowo
- Population: 372
- Time zone: UTC+1 (CET)
  - Summer (DST): UTC+2 (CEST)
- Vehicle registration: GWE

Gniewowo [ɡɲɛˈvɔvɔ] is a village in the administrative district of Gmina Wejherowo, within Wejherowo County, Pomeranian Voivodeship, in northern Poland. It is located within the ethnocultural region of Kashubia in the historic region of Pomerania.

Gniewowo was a royal village of the Polish Crown, administratively located in the Puck County in the Pomeranian Voivodeship.
