= Przetoczyno =

- Village
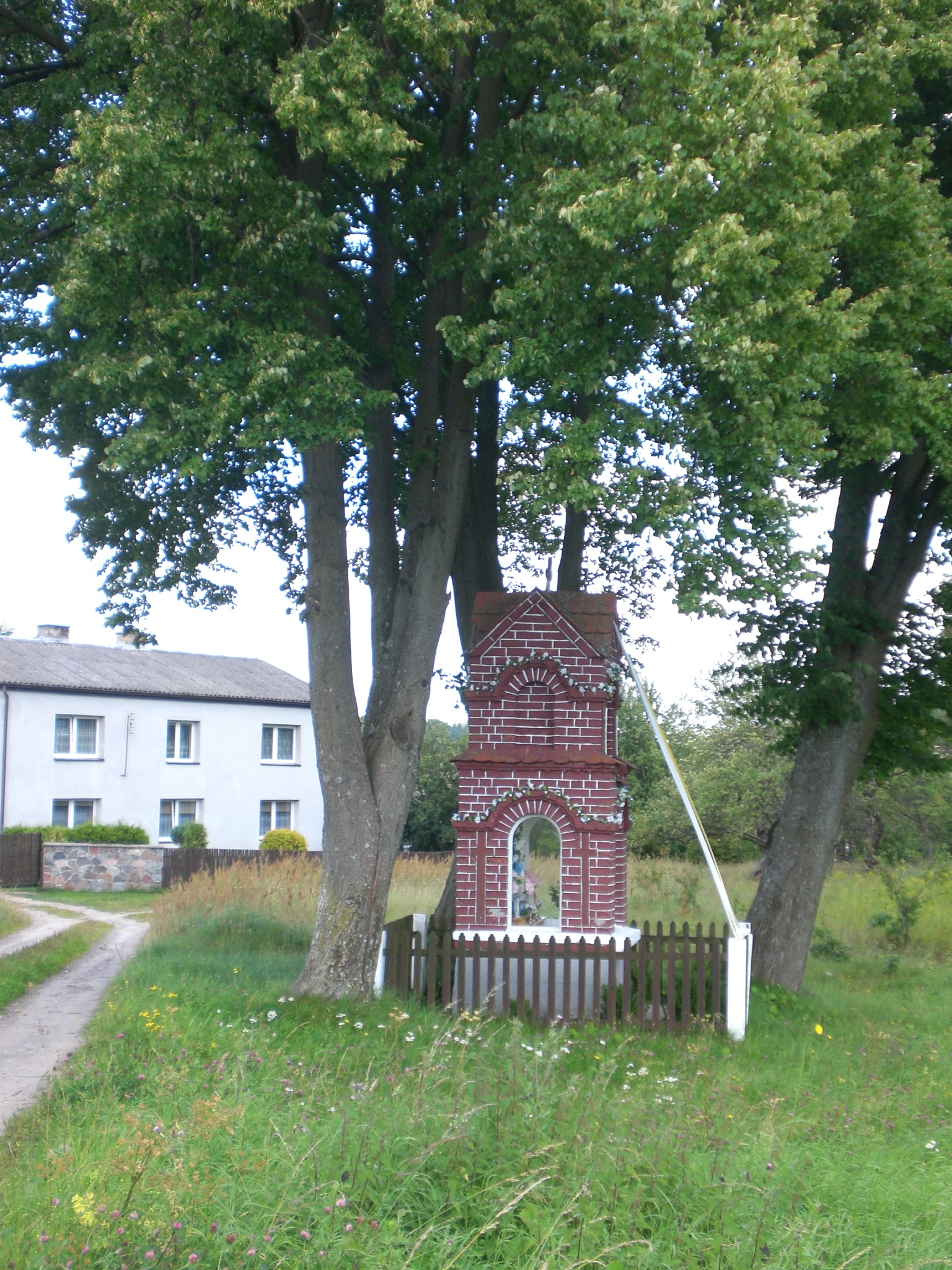
- Wayside shrine in Przetoczyno

- Location within Poland
- Coordinates: 54°31′17″N 18°12′18″E
- Country: Poland
- Voivodeship: Pomeranian
- County: Wejherowo
- Gmina: Szemud
- Population: 459
- Time zone: UTC+1 (CET)
  - Summer (DST): UTC+2 (CEST)
- Vehicle registration: GWE

Przetoczyno [pʂɛtɔˈt͡ʂɨnɔ] is a village in the administrative district of Gmina Szemud, within Wejherowo County, Pomeranian Voivodeship, in northern Poland. It is located within the ethnocultural region of Kashubia which is a historic region of Pomerania.

== History ==
Przetoczyno was a royal village of the Polish Crown, administratively located in the Puck County in the Pomeranian Voivodeship.

During the German occupation of Poland (World War II), Przetoczyno was one of the sites of executions of Poles, carried out by the Germans in 1939 as part of the Intelligenzaktion, and the Germans also expelled several Polish families, whose farms were then handed over to German colonists as part of the Lebensraum policy.
