= Gmina Szemud =

Gmina Szemud Szemud Commune
- Gmina
- Coat of arms
- Interactive map of Gmina Szemud
- Coordinates (Szemud): 54°29′12″N 18°13′32″E
- Country: Poland
- Voivodeship: Pomeranian
- County: Wejherowo
- Seat: Szemud

Area
  - Total: 176.57 km^{2} (68.17 sq mi)

Population (2006)
  - Total: 12,757
  - Density: 72.249/km^{2} (187.12/sq mi)
- Website: http://www.szemud.pl

Gmina Szemud (Kashubian: Gmina Szëmôłd) is a rural gmina (administrative district) in Wejherowo County, Pomeranian Voivodeship, in northern Poland. Its seat is the village of Szemud, which lies approximately 13 kilometres (8 mi) south of Wejherowo and 30 km (19 mi) north-west of the regional capital Gdańsk.

The gmina covers an area of 176.57 square kilometres (68.2 sq mi), and as of 2006 its total population is 12,757.

The gmina contains part of the protected area called Tricity Landscape Park.

== Villages ==
Gmina Szemud contains the villages and settlements of Bagielnica, Będargowo, Bojano, Bożanka, Czarna Dąbrowa, Czarna Góra, Częstkowo, Dębnik, Dębowa, Dobrzewino, Donimierz, Gapionka, Gęsia Krzywda, Głazica, Grabowiec, Jeleńska Huta, Kamień, Karczemki, Kieleńska Huta, Kielno, Koleczkowo, Koleczkowski Młyn, Kowalewo, Łebieńska Huta, Łebno, Łekno, Leśno, Mały Donimierz, Moczydła, Mrówczy Zamek, Nowa Karczma, Przetoczyno, Psale, Rębiska, Rosochy, Szemud, Szemudzka Huta, Szopa, Warzno, Zęblewo and Zęblewski Młyn.

== Neighbouring gminas ==
Gmina Szemud is bordered by the city of Gdynia and by the gminas of Kartuzy, Linia, Luzino, Przodkowo, Wejherowo and Żukowo.
