= Bieszkowice =

- Village
- Location within Poland
- Coordinates: 54°30′52″N 18°17′39″E
- Country: Poland
- Voivodeship: Pomeranian
- County: Wejherowo
- Gmina: Wejherowo
- Population: 312

Bieszkowice [bjɛʂkɔˈvit͡sɛ] is a village in the administrative district of Gmina Wejherowo, within Wejherowo County, Pomeranian Voivodeship, in northern Poland.

For details of the history of the region, see History of Pomerania.
