= Szemud =

- Village
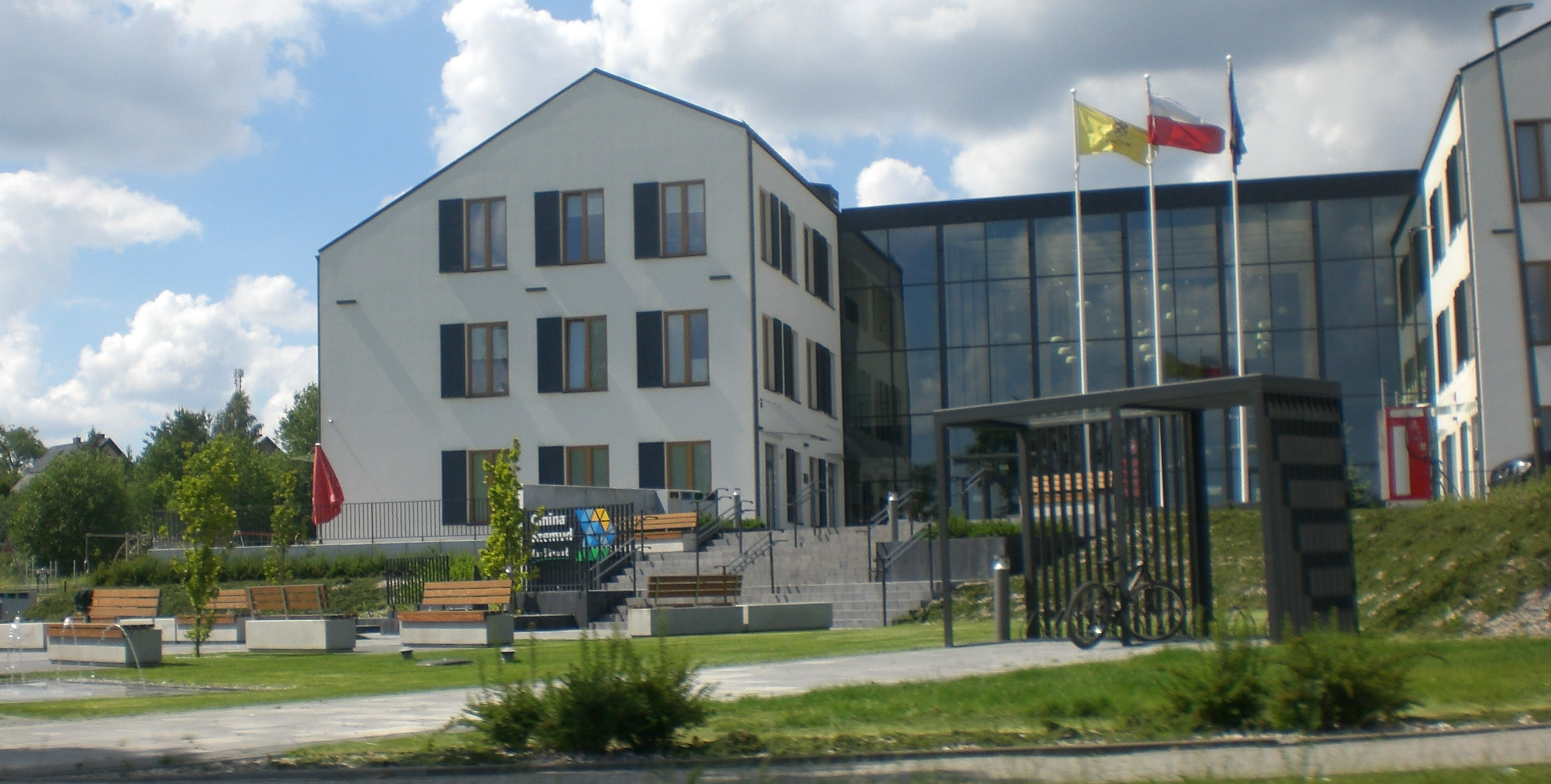
- Gmina Szemud administration building

- Location within Poland
- Coordinates: 54°29′12″N 18°13′32″E
- Country: Poland
- Voivodeship: Pomeranian
- County: Wejherowo
- Gmina: Szemud

Population
  - Total: 1,639

Szemud [ˈʂɛmut] ({Kashubian: Szëmôłd, German: Schönwalde) is a village in Wejherowo County, Pomeranian Voivodeship, in northern Poland. It is the seat of the gmina (administrative district) called Gmina Szemud.

The village serves as the administrative center for the Szemud Commune and houses the Roman Catholic parish, which is part of the Kielno deanery in the Archdiocese of Gdańsk.
