= Łężyce, Pomeranian Voivodeship =

Łężyce
- Village
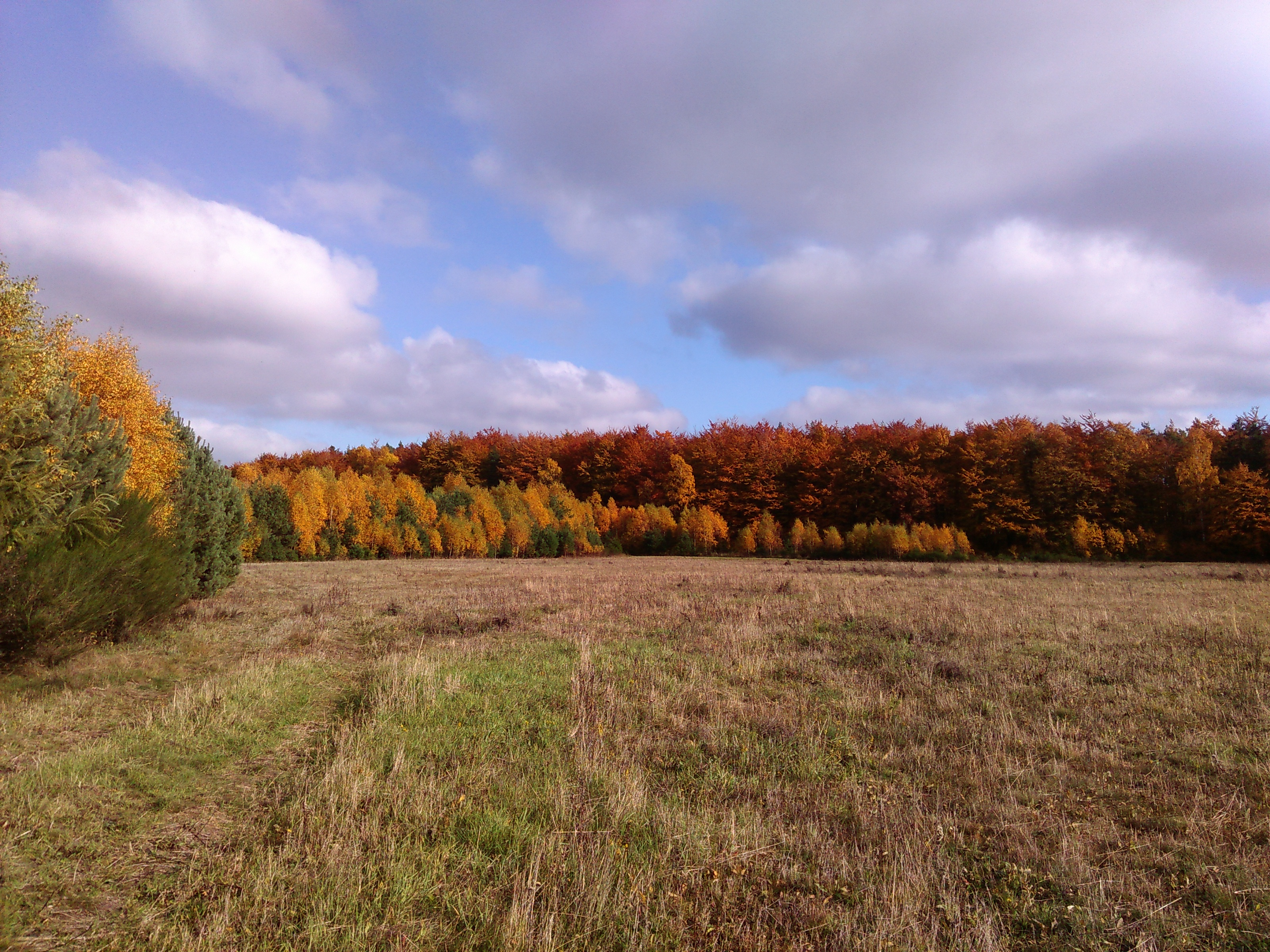

- Location within Poland
- Coordinates: 54°31′51″N 18°22′38″E
- Country: Poland
- Voivodeship: Pomeranian
- County: Wejherowo
- Gmina: Wejherowo
- Population: 407
- Time zone: UTC+1 (CET)
  - Summer (DST): UTC+2 (CEST)
- Vehicle registration: GWE

Łężyce [wɛ̃ˈʐɨt͡sɛ] is a village in the administrative district of Gmina Wejherowo, within Wejherowo County, Pomeranian Voivodeship, in northern Poland. It is located within the ethnocultural region of Kashubia in the historic region of Pomerania.

Łężyce was a royal village of the Polish Crown, administratively located in the Puck County in the Pomeranian Voivodeship.

== Notable people ==
- Edmund Roszczynialski (1888–1939), Polish Catholic priest, activist, member of the Polish resistance movement in partitioned Poland, and founder of the Polska Żyje Polish resistance organisation during World War II, murdered by the Germans in Cewice
- Hipolit Roszczynialski (1897–1939), Polish activist and soldier, murdered by the Germans in the Massacres in Piaśnica during World War II
