= Miga, Poland =

Settlement in Kashubia

Miga Mëga
- Hamlet
- Location within Poland
- Coordinates: 54°37′6″N 18°13′2″E
- Country: Poland
- Voivodeship: Pomeranian
- County: Wejherowo
- Gmina: Wejherowo

Miga [ˈmiɡa] (Kashubian: Mëga) is a hamlet in the administrative district of Gmina Wejherowo, within Wejherowo County, Pomeranian Voivodeship, in northern Poland.

For details of the history of the region, see History of Pomerania.
