= Orle, Wejherowo County =

Orle
- Village
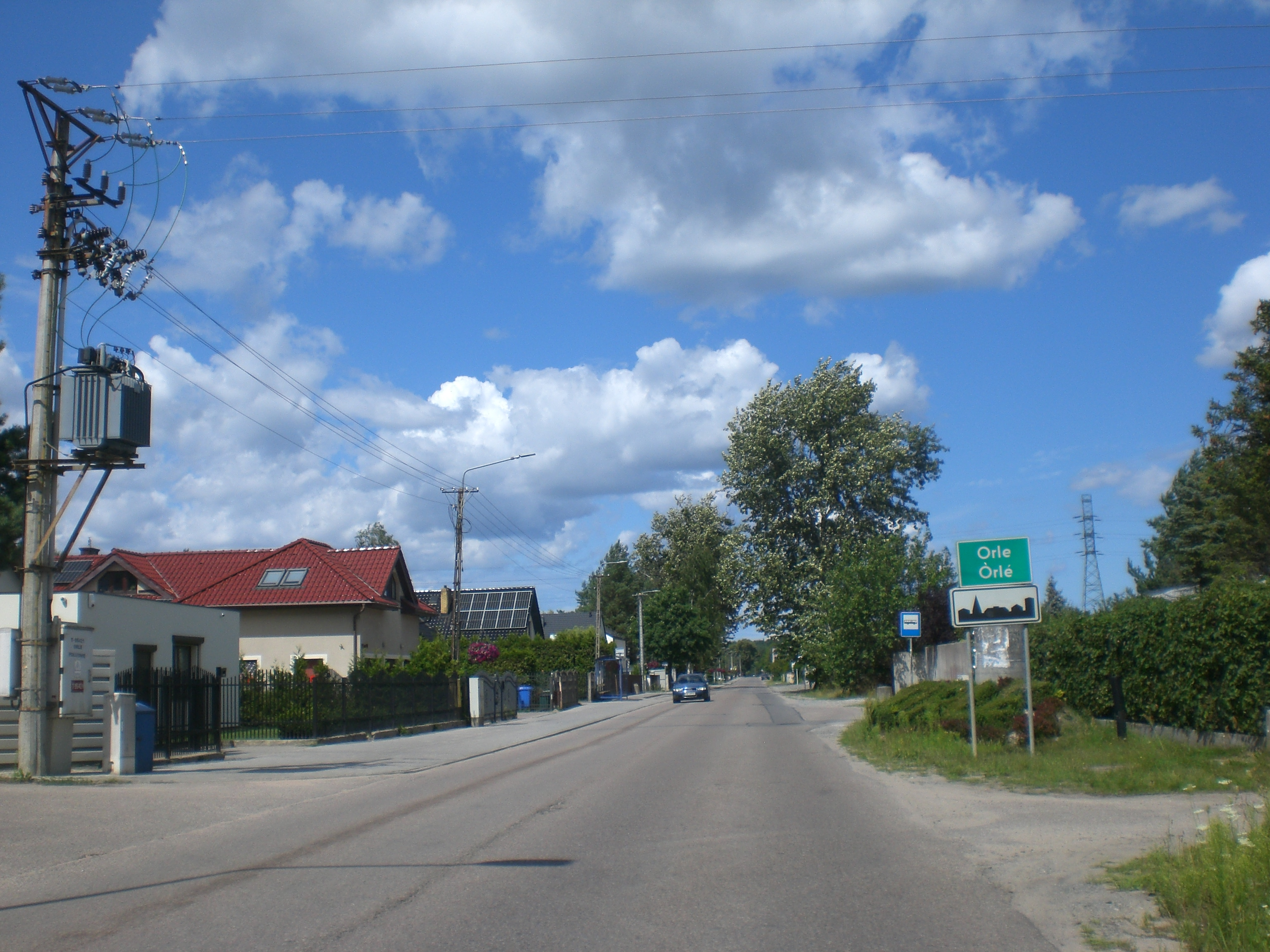

- Location within Poland
- Coordinates: 54°38′25″N 18°10′11″E
- Country: Poland
- Voivodeship: Pomeranian
- County: Wejherowo
- Gmina: Wejherowo
- Population: 1,373

Orle [ˈɔrlɛ] is a village in the administrative district of Gmina Wejherowo, within Wejherowo County, Pomeranian Voivodeship, in northern Poland.

For details of the history of the region, see History of Pomerania.
