= Paradyż, Pomeranian Voivodeship =

Settlement in Kashubia

Paradyż Paradiz
- Colony
- Location within Poland
- Coordinates: 54°38′13″N 18°8′7″E
- Country: Poland
- Voivodeship: Pomeranian
- County: Wejherowo
- Gmina: Wejherowo

Paradyż [paˈradɨʂ] (Kashubian: Paradiz) is a colony in the administrative district of Gmina Wejherowo, within Wejherowo County, Pomeranian Voivodeship, in northern Poland.

For details of the history of the region, see History of Pomerania.
