= Symbols of Wejherowo County =

The coat of arms of Wejherowo County.

The flag of Wejherowo County.

The coat of arms of Wejherowo County, Pomeranian Voivodeship, located in north-central Poland, consists of a black griffin with a black crown on its head, and a grey (silver) band (stripe) running from the top right to the bottom left corner of the shield, with three red roses on it. The design is placed within a light orange (golden) escutcheon (shield). The flag of the county is divided vertically into two stripes of identical width; black on the left, and light orange on the right. In the centre of the left field is placed the coat of arms. Both symbols were established in 2000.

== Design ==
The coat of arms of Wejherowo County consists of a light orange (golden) Iberian style escutcheon (shield) with a square top and rounded base. It depicts a black griffin, with a black crown on its head, and an open beak with a red tongue sticking out of it. It faces to the viewer's left, stands on its back legs, with its front legs and wings rose, and a tail curled down between its back legs. The shield also features a grey (silver) band (stripe), which runs from the top right to the bottom left corner of the shield and is placed in front of the creature. On it, are placed three roses.

The griffin references the black griffin from the coat of arms of Kashubia, a cultural region that the county is a part of. The grey stripe symbolizes Cedron river located in the county. The three roses have two meanings; firstly, they symbolize the Jakub Wejher, the founder of the town of Wejherowo, who belonged to the heraldic clan of the Wejher coat of arms, which features three red roses. They also symbolize dignity, bravery, and faith.

The flag of Wejherowo County is divided vertically into two stripes of identical width. They are black on the left, and light orange on the right. In the centre of the left field is placed the coat of arms. The flag proportions have the aspect ratio of its height to its width equal to 5:8.

== History ==
In 1999, the Wejherowo County Council organized a contest to create a coat of arms for the county. The coat of arms and flag of the county were established on 25 August 2000.
