= Gmina Wejherowo =

Gmina Wejherowo Wejherowo Commune
- Gmina
- Coat of arms
- Interactive map of Gmina Wejherowo
- Coordinates (Wejherowo): 54°36′N 18°15′E
- Country: Poland
- Voivodeship: Pomeranian
- County: Wejherowo
- Seat: Wejherowo

Area
  - Total: 194.08 km^{2} (74.93 sq mi)

Population (2006)
  - Total: 18,688
  - Density: 96.290/km^{2} (249.39/sq mi)
- Website: http://www.ug.wejherowo.pl

Gmina Wejherowo is a rural gmina (administrative district) in Wejherowo County, Pomeranian Voivodeship, in northern Poland. Its seat is the town of Wejherowo, although the town is not part of the territory of the gmina.

The gmina covers an area of 194.08 square kilometres (74.9 sq mi), and as of 2006 its total population is 18,688.

The gmina contains part of the protected area called Tricity Landscape Park.

== Villages ==
Gmina Wejherowo contains the villages and settlements of Biała, Białasowizna, Bieszkowice, Bolszewo, Borowo, Burch, Cierżnia, Gacyny, Głodówko, Gniewowo, Góra, Gościcino, Gwizdówka, Kąpino, Kniewo, Kotłówka, Krystkowo, Łężyce, Małe Gowino, Marianowo, Miga, Młynki, Nowiny, Nowy Dwór Wejherowski, Orle, Paradyż, Pętkowice, Piecewo, Pińskie, Pnie, Polnica, Prajsów, Prymków, Pryśniewo, Reszki, Rogulewo, Sopieszyno, Sopieszyno-Wybudowanie, Ustarbowo, Warszkowo, Warszkowski Młyn, Wielkie Gowino, Wosów, Wygoda, Wyspowo, Zamostne, Zbychowo, Zielony Dwór and Zybertowo.

== Neighbouring gminas ==
Gmina Wejherowo is bordered by the towns of Gdynia, Reda, Rumia and Wejherowo, and by the gminas of Gniewino, Krokowa, Luzino, Puck and Szemud.
