= Wejherowo County =

Wejherowo County Powiat wejherowski
- County
- Flag Coat of arms

- Division into gminas
- Coordinates (Wejherowo): 54°36′N 18°15′E
- Country: Poland
- Voivodeship: Pomeranian
- Seat: Wejherowo
- Gminas: Total 10 (incl. 3 urban): Reda; Rumia; Wejherowo; Gmina Choczewo; Gmina Gniewino; Gmina Łęczyce; Gmina Linia; Gmina Luzino; Gmina Szemud; Gmina Wejherowo

Area
  - Total: 1,279.84 km^{2} (494.15 sq mi)

Population (2019)
  - Total: 216,764
  - Density: 169.368/km^{2} (438.661/sq mi)
  - Urban: 124,823
  - Rural: 91,941
- Car plates: GWE
- Website: www.powiatwejherowski.pl

Wejherowo County (Kashubian: Wejrowsczi kréz, Polish: powiat wejherowski) is a unit of territorial administration and local government (powiat) in Pomeranian Voivodeship, northern Poland, on the Baltic coast. It came into being on January 1, 1999, as a result of the Polish local government reforms passed in 1998. Its administrative seat and largest town is Wejherowo, which lies 36 kilometres (22 mi) north-west of the regional capital Gdańsk. The county also contains the towns of Rumia, lying 11 km (7 mi) east of Wejherowo, and Reda, 7 km (4 mi) east of Wejherowo. Rumia, Reda and Wejherowo are contiguous, and are referred to as the Kashubian Tricity, an allusion to the larger Tricity area centred on Gdańsk.

The county covers an area of 1,279.84 square kilometres (494.1 sq mi). As of 2019, its total population is 216,764, out of which the population of Wejherowo is 49,652, that of Rumia is 49,160, that of Reda is 26,011, and the rural population is 91,941.

Wejherowo County on a map of the counties of Pomeranian Voivodeship

Wejherowo County is bordered by Puck County to the north-east, the city of Gdynia to the east, Kartuzy County to the south and Lębork County to the west. It also borders the Baltic Sea to the north.

== Location ==
According to data from January 1, 2012, the county's area was 1,228.25 km^{2} (474.23 sq mi).

The neighboring counties are: Kartuzy County, Lębork County, Puck County and city with county rights Gdynia.

== Administrative divisions ==
The county is subdivided into 10 gminas (three urban and seven rural). These are listed in the following table, in descending order of population.

Gmina	Type	Area (km^{2})	Population (2019)	Seat
Wejherowo	urban	25.7	49,652	
Rumia	urban	32.9	49,160	
Gmina Wejherowo	rural	194.1	26,129	Wejherowo *
Reda	urban	29.5	26,011	
Gmina Luzino	rural	111.9	16,391	Luzino
Gmina Szemud	rural	176.6	18,074	Szemud
Gmina Łęczyce	rural	232.8	12,024	Łęczyce
Gmina Gniewino	rural	176.2	7,437	Gniewino
Gmina Linia	rural	119.8	6,389	Linia
Gmina Choczewo	rural	183.2	5,497	Choczewo
* seat not part of the gmina
