= Thadden family =

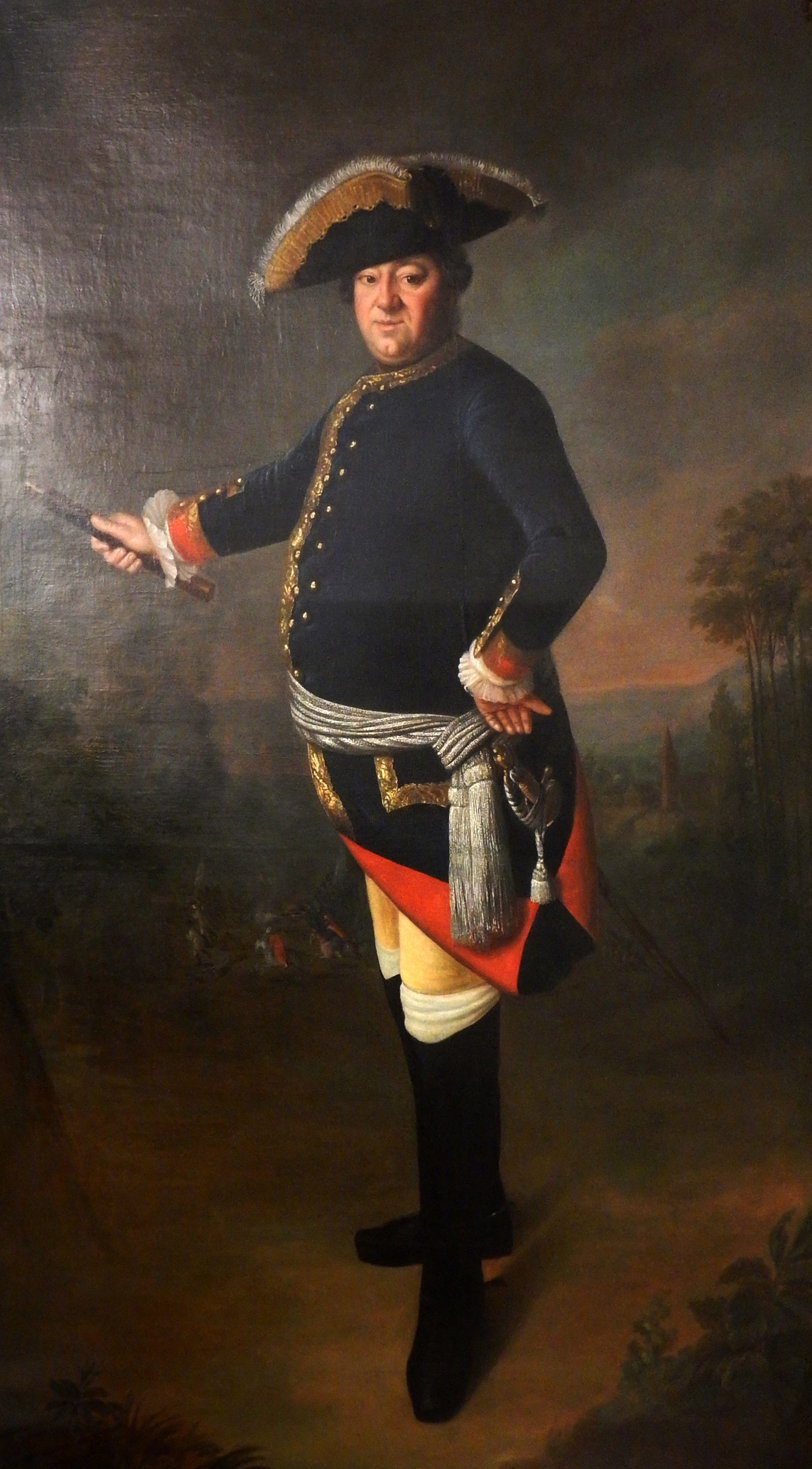
General Georg Reinold von Thadden

The Thadden family is a German Uradel family with its roots in Eastern Pomerania (Pomerelia).

== History ==
A miles (knight) Geroslaus (Jarislav) Taditz ("son of Thaddeus") was first mentioned in a 1334 register of the State of the Teutonic Order in the lands of the former Samboride dukes of Pomerelia at Danzig. The family's ancestral seat was Tadden (present-day Tadzino in the Polish Pomeranian Voivodeship). The dynasty's territory was part of Lauenburg and Bütow Land, which after the Order's defeat and the Second Peace of Thorn in 1466 was held by the Imperial Dukes of Pomerania as a Polish fief. Early on, the family split into two branches with different arms:

The Nesnachow Branch: first mentioned in the course of the 1493 enfeoffment of one Matthies with the lordship of Nesnachow (present-day Nieznachowo) north of Lauenburg (Lębork) by Duke Bogislaw X of Pomerania.

The seats of the second branch were Tadden-Enzow and Rybienke in the east of Lauenburg, but also in the adjacent Pomerelian lands of Puck: a first reference in 1469 mentions Peter Tadde, Lord of Rutzau (Rzucewo), other members called themselves Lords of Polchau (Połchowo) and Klanin (Kłanino). In 1527 the Ribienke branch also received the fiefs of Dzinzelitz (Dzięcielec), Bonswitz (Bąsewice) and Reddestow (Redystowo) from the hands of the Pomeranian dukes.

When upon the extinction of the ducal House of Griffins the Lauenburg and Bütow fief had passed to Brandenburg-Prussia according to the 1657 Treaty of Bromberg, several members of the family became Prussian officials and commanders in the Prussian Army.

== Notable members ==
Important or well-known members of this family include:

- Adolf von Thadden-Trieglaff (1796–1882), Conservative politician, leader of the Great Awakening movement in the Prussian Province of Pomerania and member of the German Table Society
- Elisabeth von Thadden (1890–1944), resistance fighter, member of the Solf Circle, executed by the Nazis for participation in the 20 July plot
- Reinold von Thadden (1891–1976), brother, German theologian and lawyer, member of the Confessing Church and founder of the German Evangelical Church Congress
- Adolf von Thadden (1921–1996), half-brother, far-right German politician (Nazi, DRP, NPD)
- Henning von Thadden (1898–1945), Lieutenant General of the German Army
- Franz-Lorenz von Thadden (1924–1979), son of Reinold, German politician (CDU), member of the Bundestag
- Rudolf von Thadden (1932–2015), his brother, German historian
  - Wiebke von Thadden (born 1931), his wife, German writer
- Ernst-Ludwig von Thadden (born 1959), their son, German economist
- Elisabeth von Thadden (born 1961), his sister, German journalist
- Johannes von Thadden (born 1956), son of Franz-Lorenz, federal executive secretary of the CDU 2004-07
- Eberhard von Thadden (1909–1964 - car accident), Nazi and SS member, assistant of the Judenreferat under Franz Rademacher at the Foreign Office, prepared the deportation of Jews from Salonika.
