= Godętowo railway station =

Railway station in Pomeranian Voivodeship, Poland

Godętowo
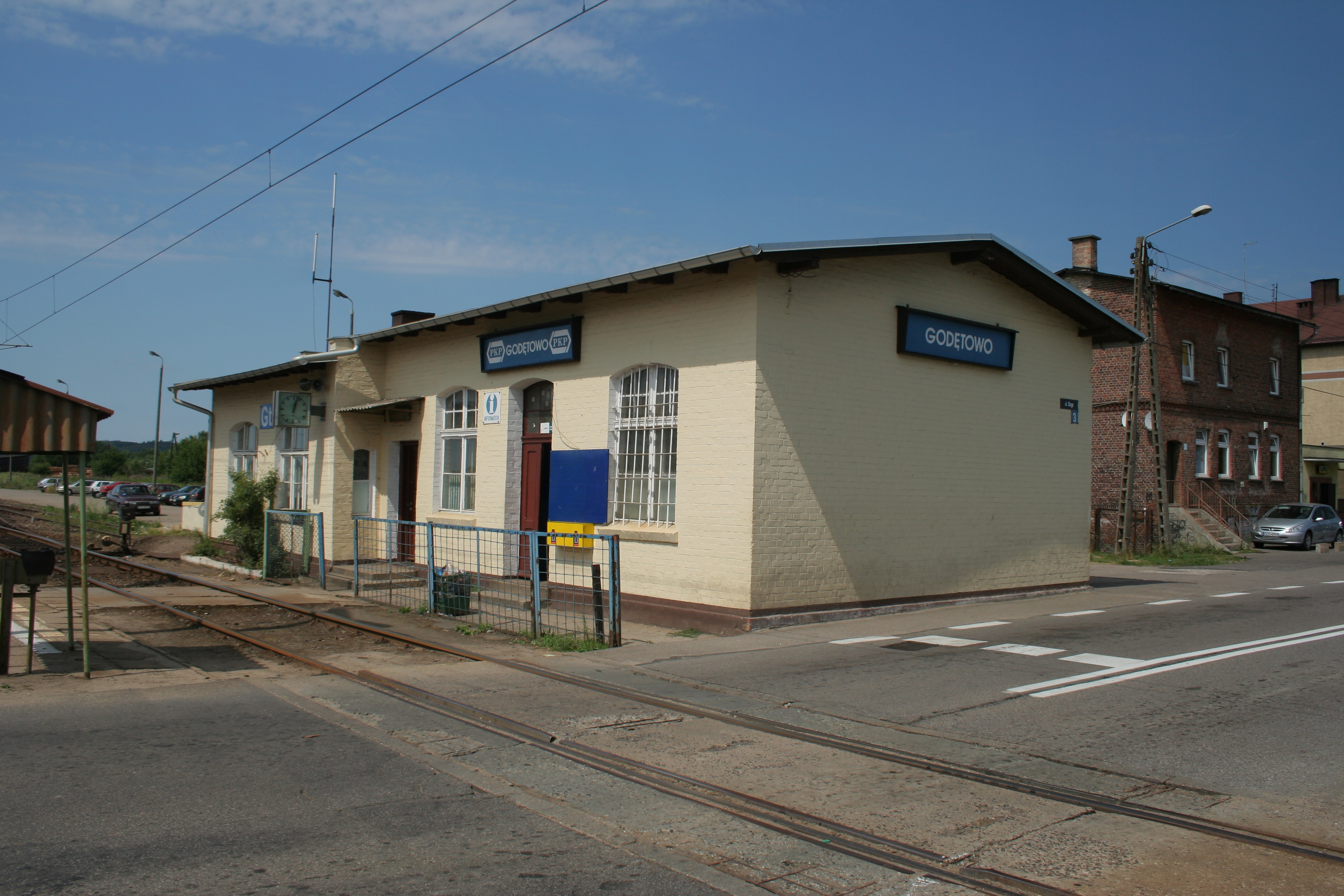

General information
- Location: Długa 3, Godętowo; Poland
- Coordinates: 54.582134°N 17.864767°E
- Owner: Polskie Koleje Państwowe S.A.
- Line: 202: Gdańsk Główny–Stargard railway
- Platforms: 1

Construction
- Structure type: Building: Yes; Depot: Never existed Water tower: Never existed

History
- Former names: Goddentow Lanz until 1945; Goddentow

Services
Preceding station	Polregio	Following station
Lębork Mosty towards Słupsk	PR	Bożepole Wielkie towards Tczew
Lębork Mosty towards Słupsk	PR	Bożepole Wielkie towards Malbork
Lębork Mosty towards Słupsk	PR	Bożepole Wielkie towards Elbląg
Lębork Mosty towards Słupsk	PR	Bożepole Wielkie towards Smętowo, Laskowice Pomorskie, or Bydgoszcz Główna
Lębork Mosty towards Słupsk	PR	Bożepole Wielkie towards Gdynia Główna
Preceding station	SKM Tricity	Following station
Lębork Mosty towards Lębork	SKM Tricity	Bożepole Wielkie towards Gdańsk Śródmieście
Location

Godętowo is a PKP railway station in Godętowo (Pomeranian Voivodeship), Poland.

== Lines crossing the station ==
Start station	End station	Line type
Gdańsk Główny	Stargard Szczeciński	Passenger/Freight

== Train services ==
The station is served by the following services:

- Regional services (R) Tczew — Słupsk
- Regional services (R) Malbork — Słupsk
- Regional services (R) Elbląg — Słupsk
- Regional services (R) Słupsk — Bydgoszcz Główna
- Regional services (R) Słupsk — Gdynia Główna
- Szybka Kolej Miejska services (SKM) (Lebork -) Wejherowo - Reda - Rumia - Gdynia - Sopot - Gdansk
