= Gościcino Wejherowskie railway station =

Railway station in Gościcino, Poland

Coordinates: 54°36′18″N 18°09′39″E

Gościnino Wejherowskie
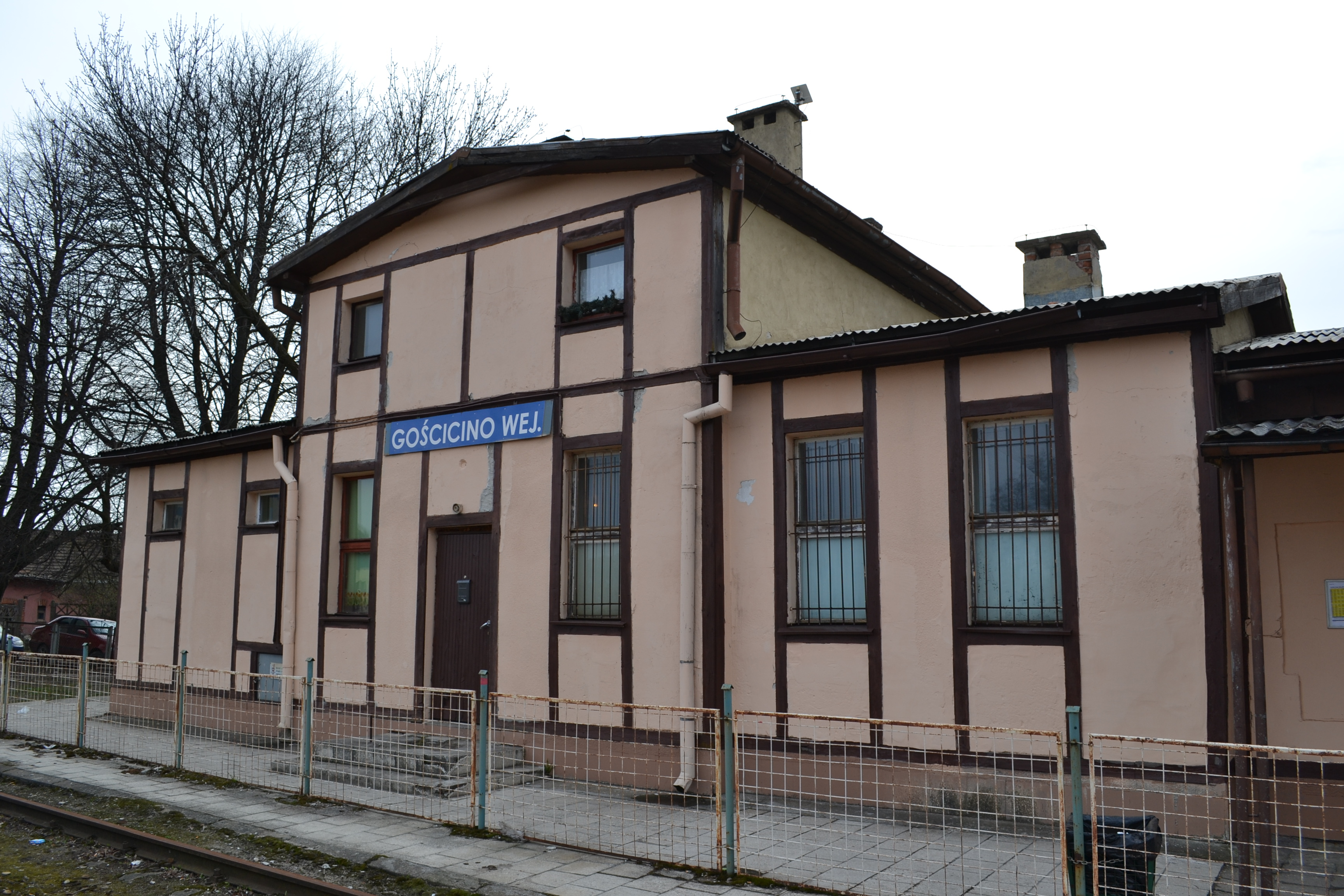

General information
- Location: Gościcino Wejherowskie; Poland
- Owner: Polskie Koleje Państwowe S.A.
- Line: 202: Gdańsk Główny–Stargard railway
- Platforms: 2

Construction
- Structure type: Building: Yes (no longer used); Depot: Never existed Water tower: No

History
- Former names: Gossentin (Westpreußen) until 1945

Services
Preceding station	Polregio	Following station
Luzino towards Słupsk	PR	Wejherowo towards Tczew
Luzino towards Słupsk	PR	Wejherowo towards Malbork
Luzino towards Słupsk	PR	Wejherowo towards Elbląg
Luzino towards Słupsk	PR	Wejherowo towards Smętowo, Laskowice Pomorskie, or Bydgoszcz Główna
Luzino towards Luzino or Słupsk	PR	Wejherowo towards Gdynia Główna
Preceding station	SKM Tricity	Following station
Luzino towards Lębork	SKM Tricity	Wejherowo towards Gdańsk Śródmieście
Location

Gościnino Wejherowskie is a PKP railway station in Gościcino Wejherowskie (Pomeranian Voivodeship), Poland.

== Lines crossing the station ==
Start station	End station	Line type
Gdańsk Główny	Stargard Szczeciński	Passenger/Freight

== Train services ==
The station is served by the following services:

- Regional services (R) Tczew — Słupsk
- Regional services (R) Malbork — Słupsk
- Regional services (R) Elbląg — Słupsk
- Regional services (R) Słupsk — Bydgoszcz Główna
- Regional services (R) Luzino — Gdynia Główna
- Regional services (R) Słupsk — Gdynia Główna
- Szybka Kolej Miejska services (SKM) (Lebork -) Wejherowo - Reda - Rumia - Gdynia - Sopot - Gdansk
