= Luzino railway station =

Railway station in Luzino, Poland

Luzino
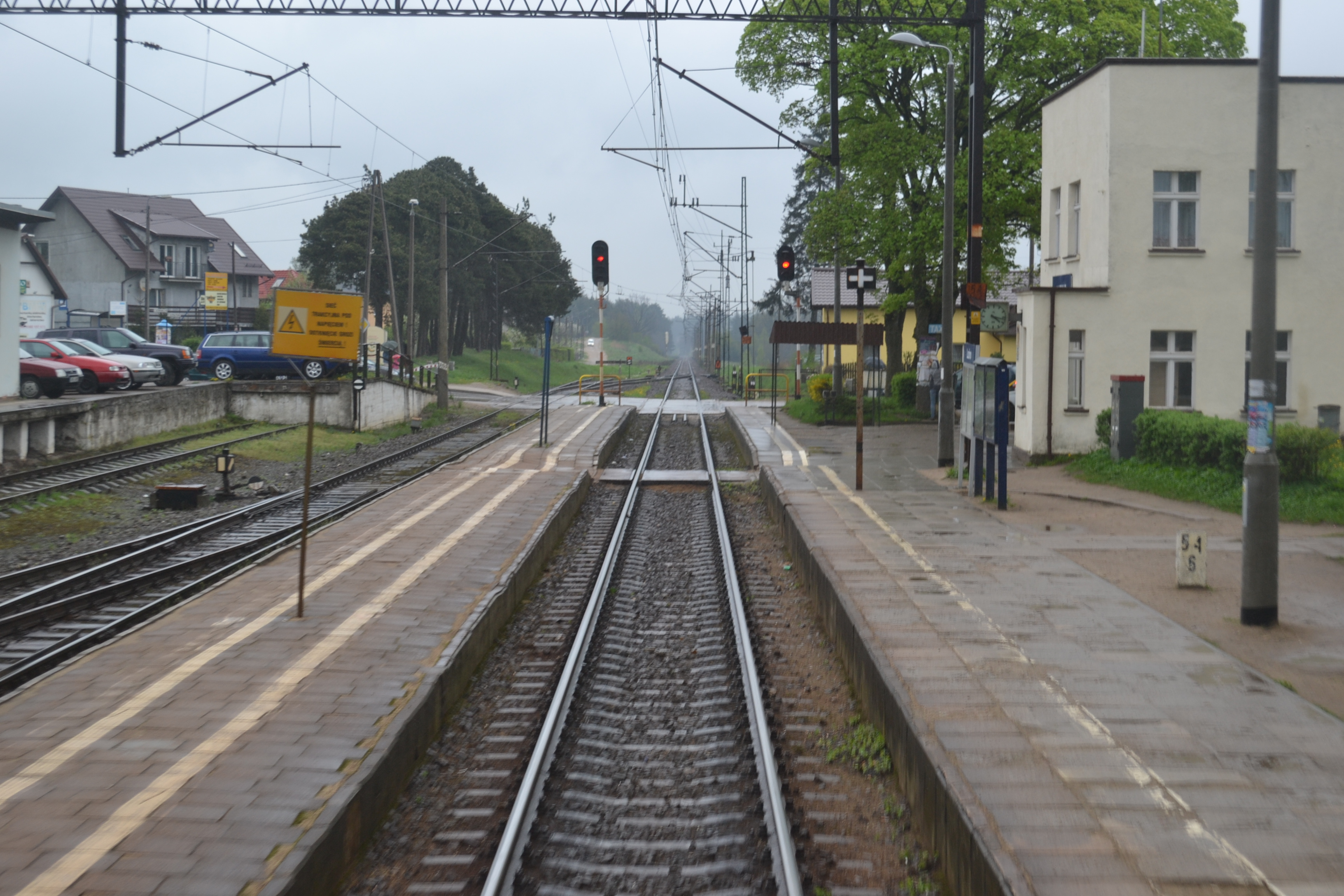

General information
- Location: Luzino; Poland
- Coordinates: 54.567113°N 18.103707°E
- Owner: Polskie Koleje Państwowe S.A.
- Line: 202: Gdańsk Główny–Stargard railway
- Platforms: 2

Construction
- Structure type: Building: Yes; Depot: Never existed Water tower: No

History
- Former names: Gossentin (Westpreußen) until 1945

Services
Preceding station	Polregio	Following station
Strzebielino Morskie towards Słupsk	PR	Gościcino Wejherowskie towards Tczew
Strzebielino Morskie towards Słupsk	PR	Gościcino Wejherowskie towards Malbork
Strzebielino Morskie towards Słupsk	PR	Gościcino Wejherowskie towards Elbląg
Strzebielino Morskie towards Słupsk	PR	Gościcino Wejherowskie towards Smętowo, Laskowice Pomorskie, or Bydgoszcz Główna
Terminus	PR	Gościcino Wejherowskie towards Gdynia Główna
Strzebielino Morskie towards Słupsk	PR	Gościcino Wejherowskie towards Gdynia Główna
Preceding station	SKM Tricity	Following station
Strzebielino Morskie towards Lębork	SKM Tricity	Gościcino Wejherowskie towards Gdańsk Śródmieście
Location

Luzino is a PKP railway station in Luzino (Pomeranian Voivodeship), Poland.

== Lines crossing the station ==
Start station	End station	Line type
Gdańsk Główny	Stargard Szczeciński	Passenger/Freight

== Train services ==
The station is served by the following services:

- Regional services (R) Tczew — Słupsk
- Regional services (R) Malbork — Słupsk
- Regional services (R) Elbląg — Słupsk
- Regional services (R) Słupsk — Bydgoszcz Główna
- Regional services (R) Luzino — Gdynia Główna
- Regional services (R) Słupsk — Gdynia Główna
- Szybka Kolej Miejska services (SKM) (Lebork -) Wejherowo - Reda - Rumia - Gdynia - Sopot - Gdansk
