= Rozłazino railway station =

Railway station in Pomeranian Voivodeship, Poland

Rozłazino

General information
- Location: Rozłazino; Poland
- Coordinates: 54.522348°N 17.909544°E
- Owner: Polskie Koleje Państwowe S.A.
- Platforms: 1

Construction
- Structure type: Building: Yes (no longer used); Depot: Never existed Water tower: Never existed

History
- Former names: Nawitz until 1945
Location

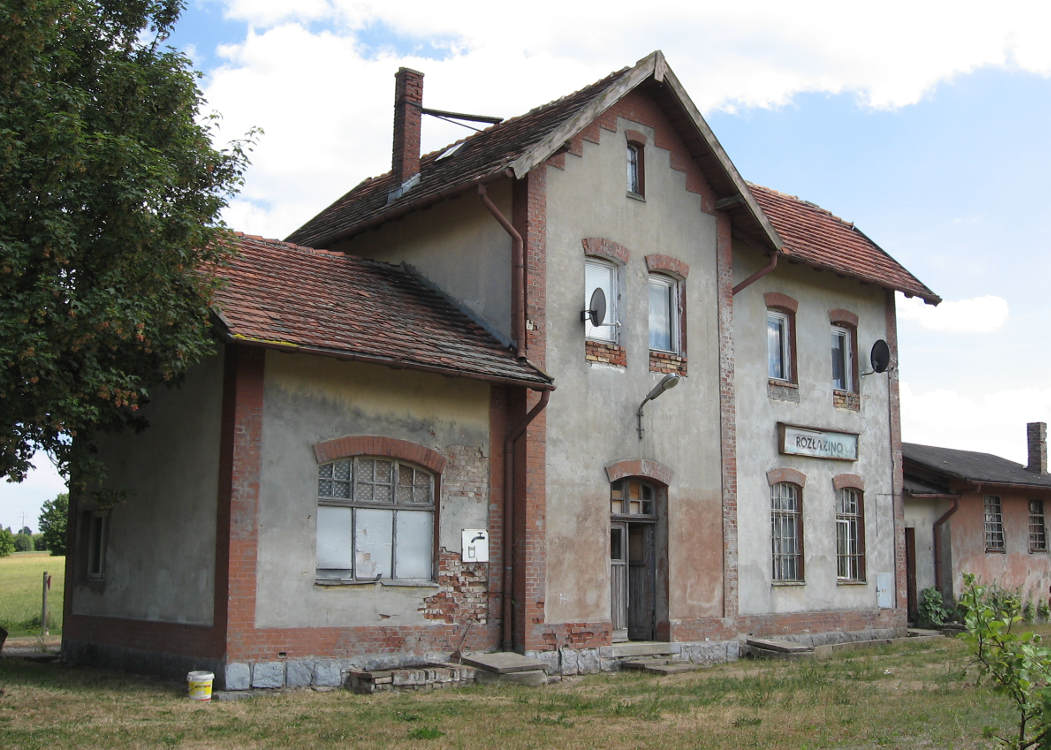
The railway stop building in Rozłazin in 2010.

Rozłazino is a non-operational PKP railway station in Rozłazino (Pomeranian Voivodeship), Poland.

== Lines crossing the station ==
Start station	End station	Line type
Pruszcz Gdański	Łeba	Dismantled
