= Strzebielino Morskie railway station =

Railway station in Strzebielino, Poland

Strzebielino Morskie
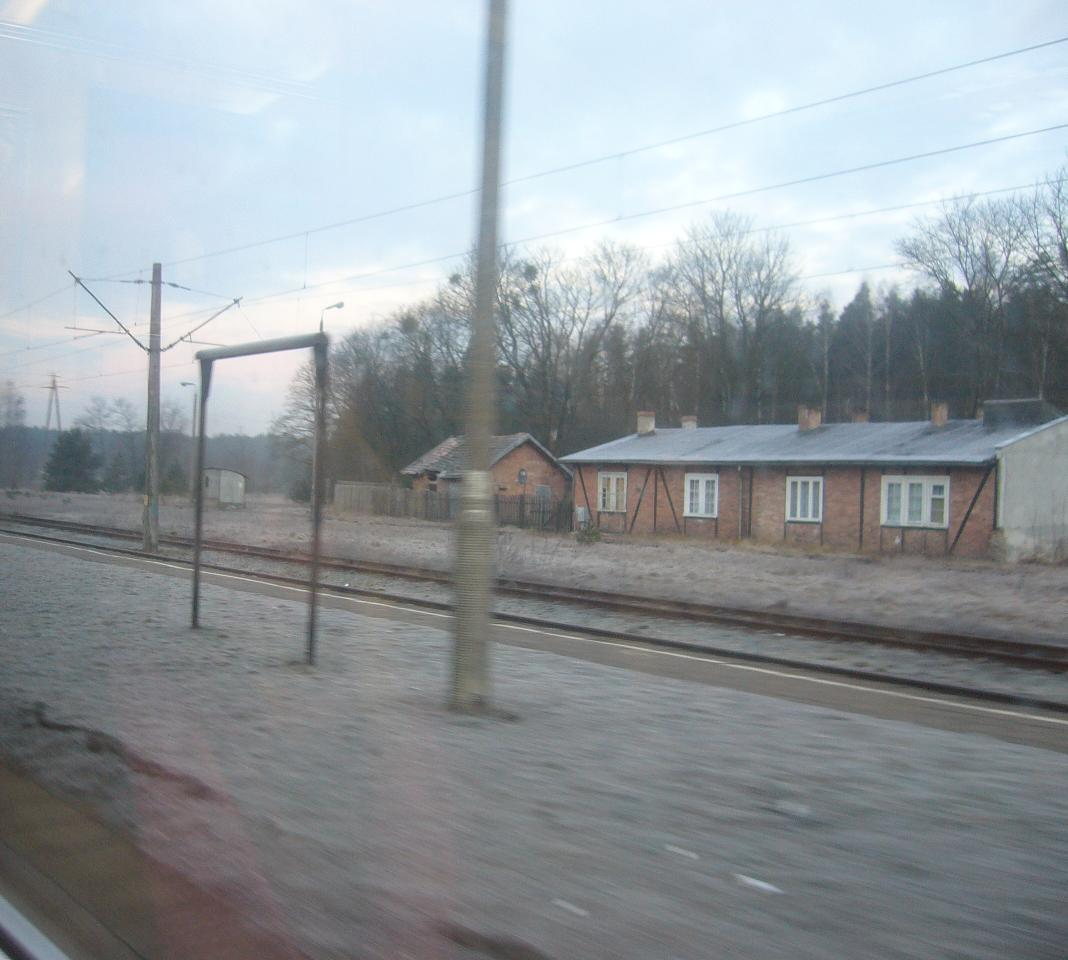

General information
- Location: Strzebielino; Poland
- Owner: Polskie Koleje Państwowe S.A.
- Line: 202: Gdańsk Główny–Stargard railway
- Platforms: 1

Construction
- Structure type: Building: Yes; Depot: Never existed Water tower: No

History
- Former names: Strebelsdorf until 1945

Services
Preceding station	Polregio	Following station
Bożepole Wielkie towards Słupsk	PR	Luzino towards Tczew
Bożepole Wielkie towards Słupsk	PR	Luzino towards Malbork
Bożepole Wielkie towards Słupsk	PR	Luzino towards Elbląg
Bożepole Wielkie towards Słupsk	PR	Luzino towards Smętowo, Laskowice Pomorskie, or Bydgoszcz Główna
Bożepole Wielkie towards Słupsk	PR	Luzino towards Gdynia Główna
Preceding station	SKM Tricity	Following station
Bożepole Wielkie towards Lębork	SKM Tricity	Luzino towards Gdańsk Śródmieście
Location

Strzebielino Morskie is a PKP railway station in Strzebielino, Pomeranian Voivodeship, Poland.

== Lines crossing the station ==
Start station	End station	Line type
Gdańsk Główny	Stargard Szczeciński	Passenger/Freight

== Train services ==
The station is served by the following services:

- Regional services (R) Tczew — Słupsk
- Regional services (R) Malbork — Słupsk
- Regional services (R) Elbląg — Słupsk
- Regional services (R) Słupsk — Bydgoszcz Główna
- Regional services (R) Słupsk — Gdynia Główna
- Szybka Kolej Miejska services (SKM) (Lebork -) Wejherowo - Reda - Rumia - Gdynia - Sopot - Gdansk
