= Nawcz railway station =

Railway station in Nawcz, Poland

Nawcz

General information
- Location: Nawcz; Poland
- Owner: Polskie Koleje Państwowe S.A.

Construction
- Structure type: Building: Never existed Depot: Never existed Water tower: Never existed

History
- Former names: Nawitz until 1945
Location

Nawcz is a non-operational PKP railway station in Nawcz (Pomeranian Voivodeship), Poland.

== Lines crossing the station ==
Start station	End station	Line type
Pruszcz Gdański	Łeba	Dismantled
