= Bożepole Wielkie railway station =

Railway station in Bożepole Wielkie, Poland

Coordinates: 54°34′06″N 17°58′13″E

Bożepole Wielkie
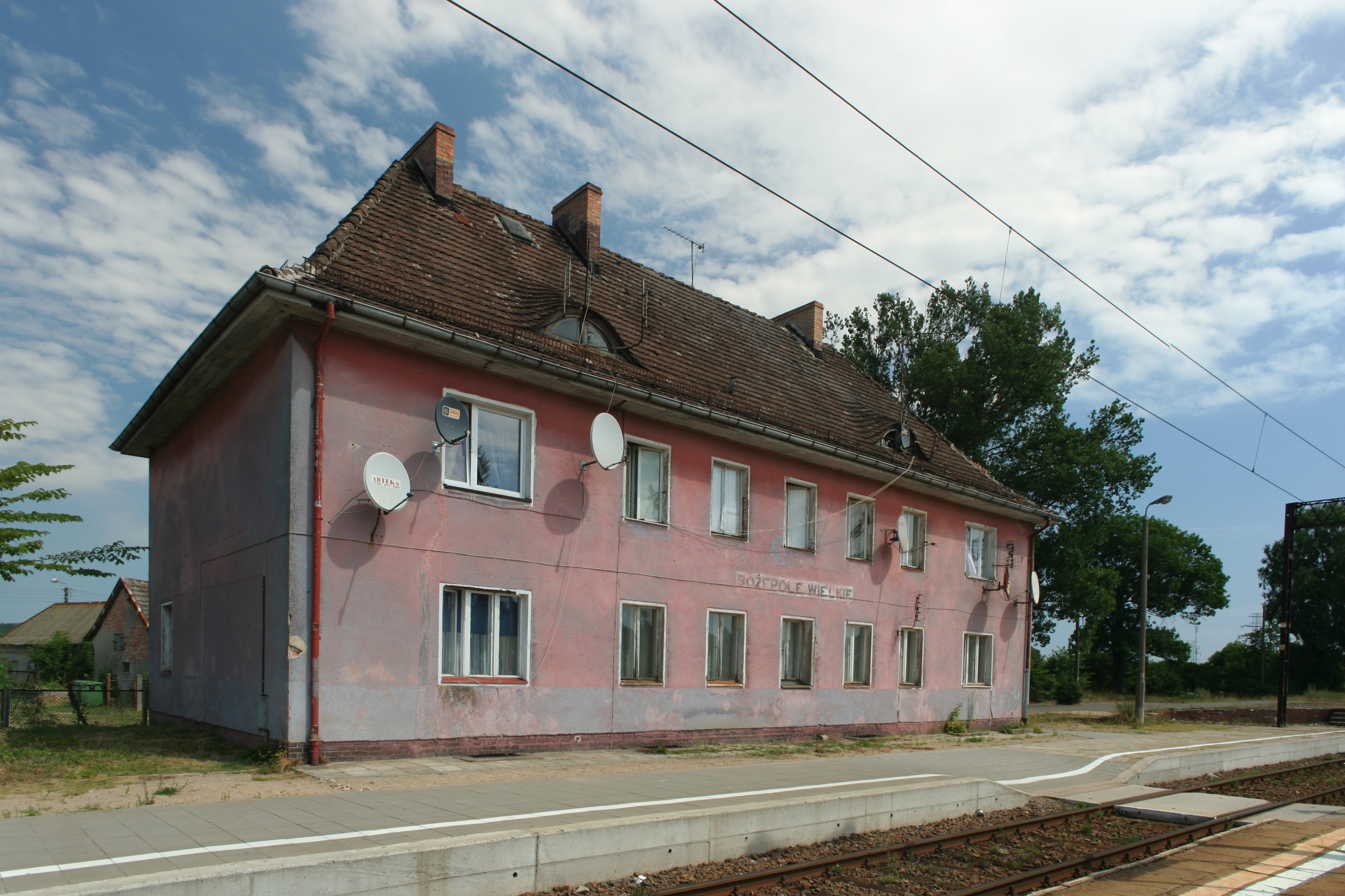

General information
- Location: Bożepole Wielkie, Pomeranian Voivodeship; Poland
- Owner: Polish State Railways
- Line: Gdańsk Główny–Stargard
- Platforms: 2

Construction
- Structure type: Building: Yes; Depot: Never existed Water tower: Never existed

History
- Former names: Groß Boschpol (before 1945)

Services
| Preceding station | Polregio | Following station |
|---|---|---|
| Godętowo towards Słupsk | PR | Strzebielino Morskie towards Tczew |
| Godętowo towards Słupsk | PR | Strzebielino Morskie towards Malbork |
| Godętowo towards Słupsk | PR | Strzebielino Morskie towards Elbląg |
| Godętowo towards Słupsk | PR | Strzebielino Morskie towards Smętowo, Laskowice Pomorskie, or Bydgoszcz Główna |
| Godętowo towards Słupsk | PR | Strzebielino Morskie towards Gdynia Główna |
| Preceding station | SKM Tricity | Following station |
| Godętowo towards Lębork | SKM Tricity | Strzebielino Morskie towards Gdańsk Śródmieście |
Location
- Location within Poland Location within Pomeranian Voivodeship

Bożepole Wielkie is a railway station in Bożepole Wielkie, Wejherowo County within the Pomeranian Voivodeship in northern Poland.

== Lines ==
| Start station | End station | Traffic |
|---|---|---|
| Gdańsk Główny | Stargard | Passenger/Freight |

== Train services ==
The station is served by the following services:

- Regional services (PR) Tczew - Słupsk
- Regional services (PR) Malbork - Słupsk
- Regional services (PR) Elbląg - Słupsk
- Regional services (PR) Słupsk - Bydgoszcz Główna
- Regional services (PR) Słupsk - Gdynia Główna
- Szybka Kolej Miejska services (SKM) (Lebork -) Wejherowo - Reda - Rumia - Gdynia - Sopot - Gdansk
