= Chmieleniec =

Village in Kashubia

Chmieleniec Chmieléńc
- Village
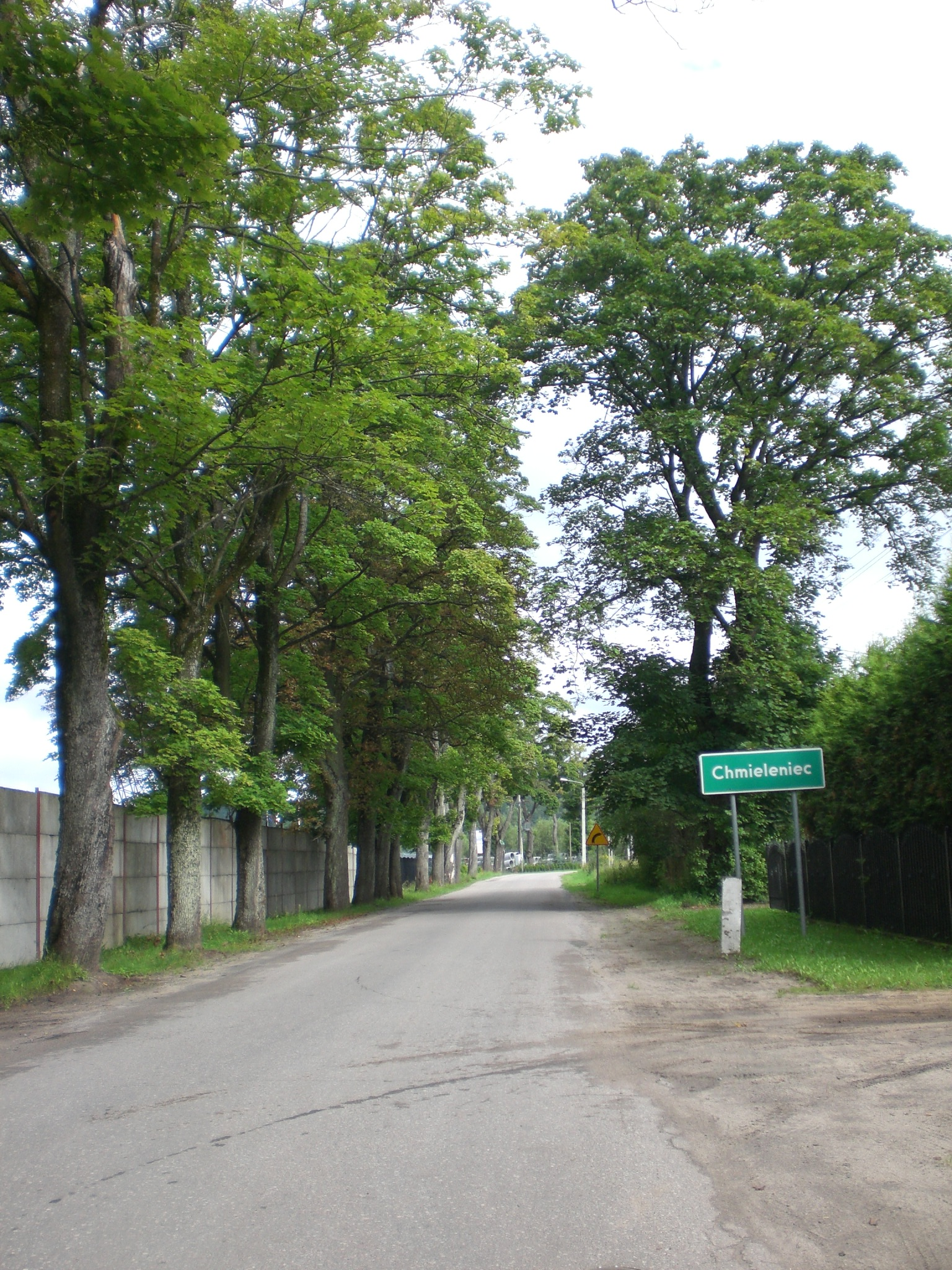

- Location within Poland
- Coordinates: 54°35′6″N 17°57′41″E
- Country: Poland
- Voivodeship: Pomeranian
- County: Wejherowo
- Gmina: Łęczyce
- Population: 163

Chmieleniec [xmjɛˈlɛɲɛt͡s] (Kashubian: Chmieléńc) is a village in the administrative district of Gmina Łęczyce, within Wejherowo County, Pomeranian Voivodeship, in northern Poland.

For details of the history of the region, see History of Pomerania.
