= Chrzanowo, Pomeranian Voivodeship =

Village in Kashubia

Chrzanowo Chrzónowò
- Village
- Location within Poland
- Coordinates: 54°39′7″N 17°53′5″E
- Country: Poland
- Voivodeship: Pomeranian
- County: Wejherowo
- Gmina: Łęczyce
- Population: 120

Chrzanowo [xʂaˈnɔvɔ] (Kashubian: Chrzónowò) is a village in the administrative district of Gmina Łęczyce, within Wejherowo County, Pomeranian Voivodeship, in northern Poland.

For details of the history of the region, see History of Pomerania.
