= Paraszyno =

Village in Pomeranian Voivodeship, Poland

Paraszyno Paraszënò
- Village
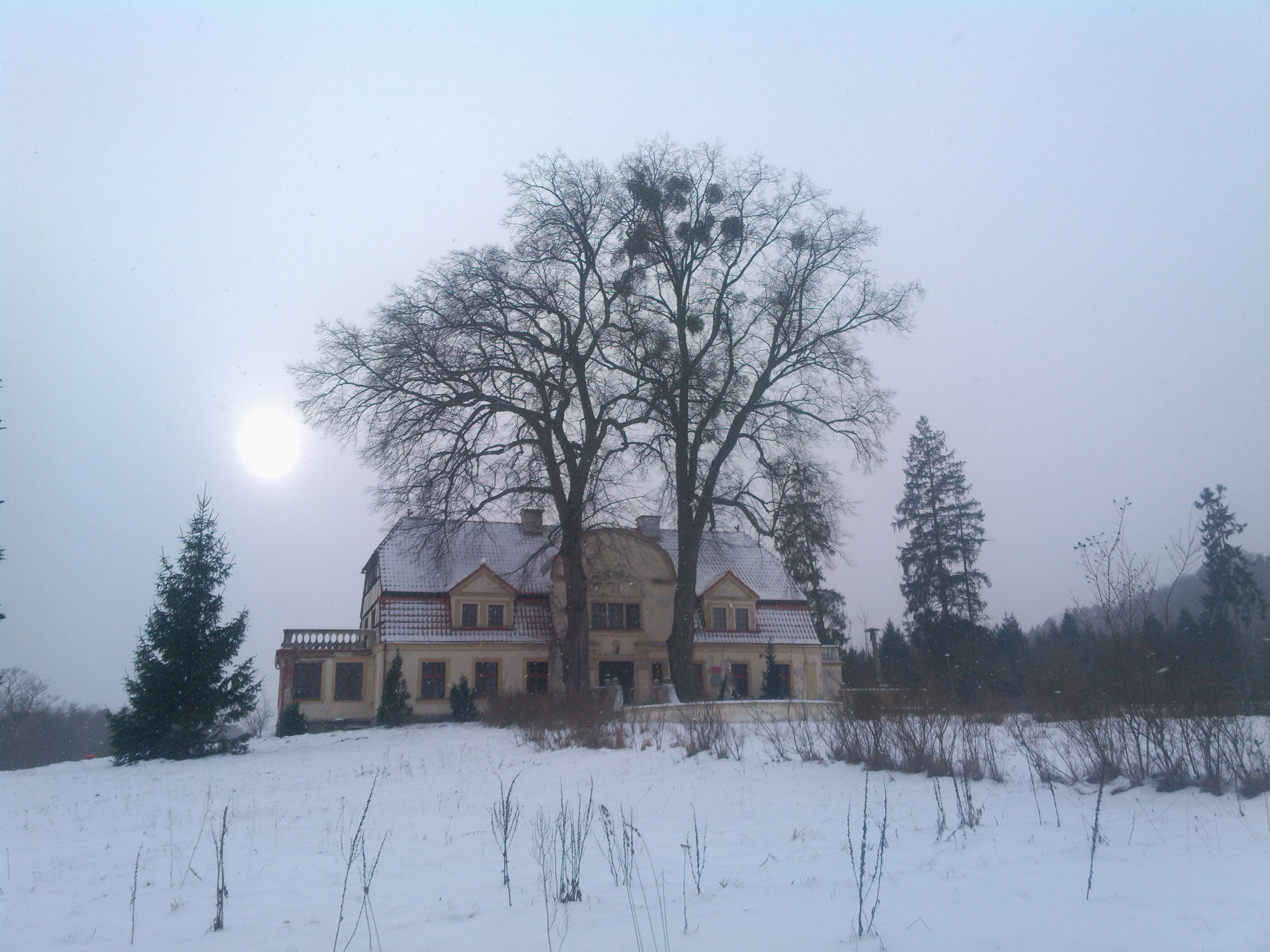
- Historic manor in Paraszyno

- Location within Poland
- Coordinates: 54°32′11″N 18°0′48″E
- Country: Poland
- Voivodeship: Pomeranian
- County: Wejherowo
- Gmina: Łęczyce
- Vehicle registration: GWE

Paraszyno [paraˈʂɨnɔ] (Kashubian: Paraszënò) is a village in the administrative district of Gmina Łęczyce, within Wejherowo County, Pomeranian Voivodeship, in northern Poland. It is located in the ethnocultural region of Kashubia in the historic region of Pomerania.

Six Polish citizens were murdered by Nazi Germany in the village during World War II.
