= Nawitz =

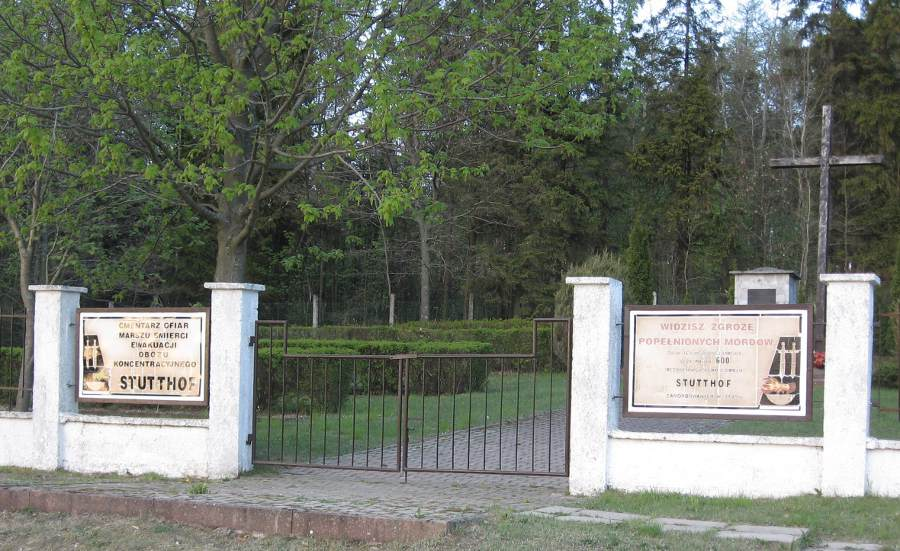
Cemetery of the victims of Nawitz and Stutthof at Nawcz

Nawitz is the German name of the town of Nawcz in northern Poland. During the occupation of Poland by the Third Reich in World War II the forced-labour camp Nawitz was set up as one of 40 subcamps of the notorious Nazi German Stutthof concentration camp near Gdańsk (totalling more than 85,000 victims before liberation).

The cemetery of prisoner victims of Auffanglager Nawitz along with those of Stutthof who perished during the final death march westward is located in the town.
