= Brzeźno Lęborskie =

Village in Kashubia

Brzeźno Lęborskie Lãbòrsczé Brzézno
- Village
- Location within Poland
- Coordinates: 54°37′26″N 17°49′54″E
- Country: Poland
- Voivodeship: Pomeranian
- County: Wejherowo
- Gmina: Łęczyce
- Population: 776

Brzeźno Lęborskie [ˈbʐɛʑnɔ lɛmˈbɔrskʲɛ] (Kashubian: Lãbòrsczé Brzézno; German: Bresin) is a village in the administrative district of Gmina Łęczyce, within Wejherowo County, Pomeranian Voivodeship, in northern Poland.

For details of the history of the region, see History of Pomerania.
