= Świetlino =

Village in Kashubia

Świetlino Swietlëno
- Village
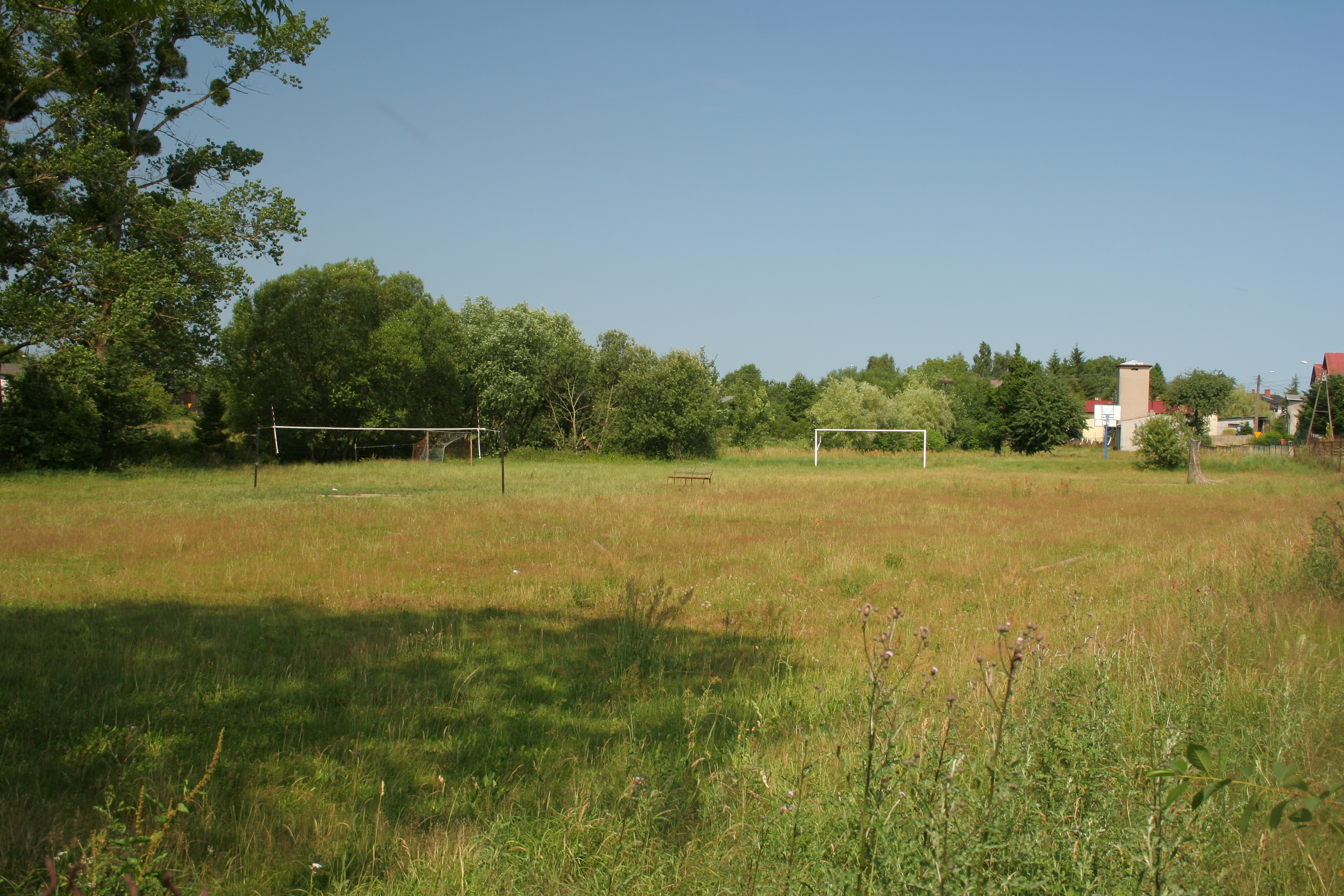
- A football field in the village

- Location within Poland
- Coordinates: 54°36′4″N 17°55′17″E
- Country: Poland
- Voivodeship: Pomeranian
- County: Wejherowo
- Gmina: Łęczyce
- Population: 240

Świetlino (Polish pronunciation: [ɕfjɛˈtlinɔ]) (Kashubian: Swietlëno) is a village in the administrative district of Gmina Łęczyce, within Wejherowo County, Pomeranian Voivodeship, in northern Poland.

For details of the history of the region, see History of Pomerania.
