= Dąbrówka Brzezińska =

Village in Kashubia

Dąbrówka Brzezińska Dãbrowka
- Village
- Location within Poland
- Coordinates: 54°37′32″N 17°53′29″E
- Country: Poland
- Voivodeship: Pomeranian
- County: Wejherowo
- Gmina: Łęczyce
- Population: 50

Dąbrówka Brzezińska [dɔmˈbrufka bʐɛˈʑiɲska] (Kashubian: Dãbrowka) is a village in the administrative district of Gmina Łęczyce, within Wejherowo County, Pomeranian Voivodeship, in northern Poland.

For details of the history of the region, see History of Pomerania.
