= Łęczyn, Pomeranian Voivodeship =

Village in Kashubia

Łęczyn Górné Łãczëno
- Village
- Location within Poland
- Coordinates: 54°36′57″N 18°1′14″E
- Country: Poland
- Voivodeship: Pomeranian
- County: Wejherowo
- Gmina: Łęczyce

Łęczyn [ˈwɛnt͡ʂɨn] (Kashubian: Górné Łãczëno) is a village in the administrative district of Gmina Łęczyce, within Wejherowo County, Pomeranian Voivodeship, in northern Poland.

For details of the history of the region, see History of Pomerania.
