= Ernst-Ludwig von Thadden =

German economist (born 1959)

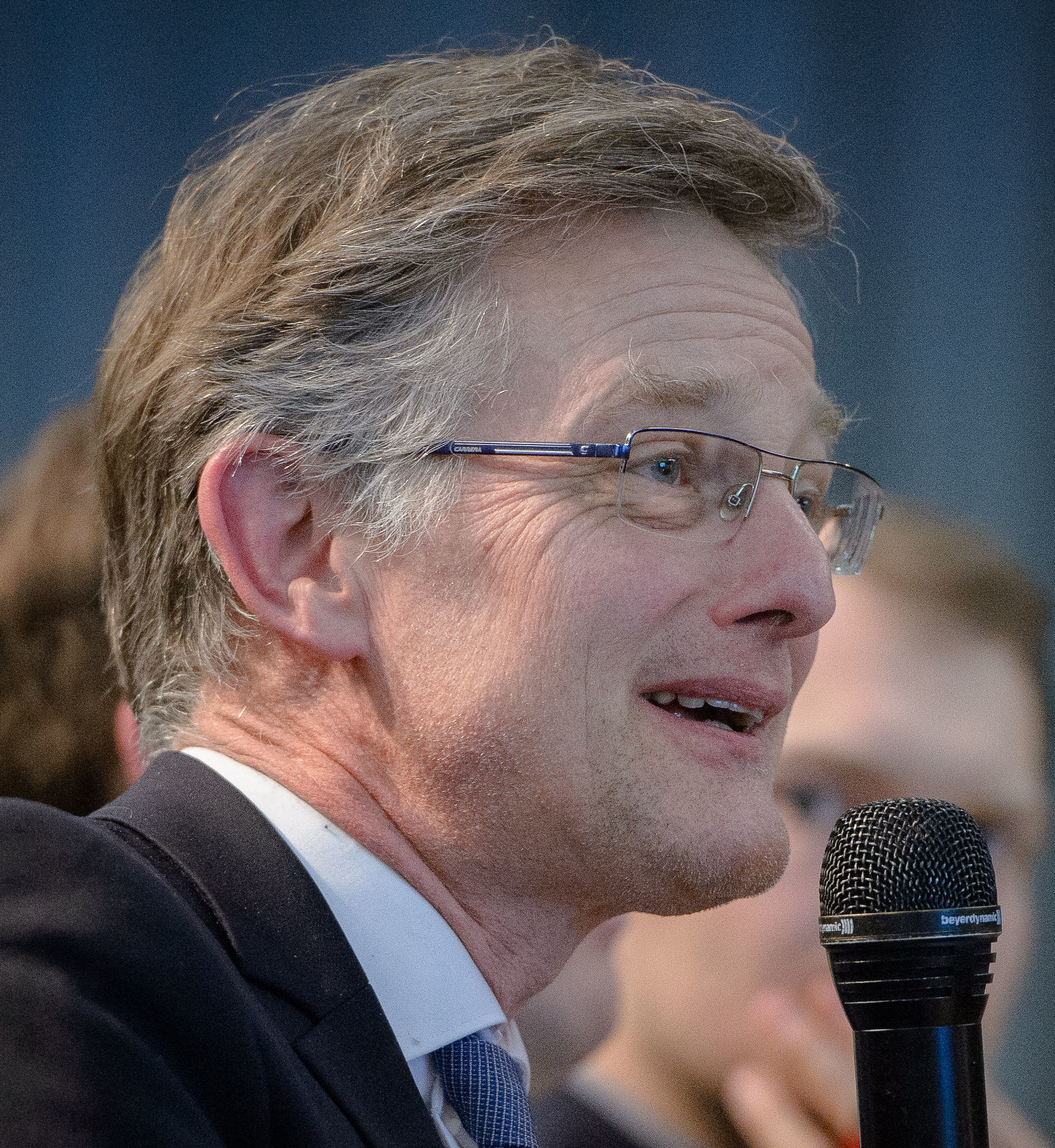
- Ernst-Ludwig von Thadden in 2016
- Born: 9 July 1959 (age 67); Göttingen, Lower Saxony, Germany
- Education: Heidelberg University; University of Bonn; London School of Economics and Political Science
- Scientific career
- Fields: Economics, Microeconomics, Capital Markets
- Workplaces: University of Mannheim

Ernst-Ludwig von Thadden (born 9 July 1959, in Göttingen, Lower Saxony, Germany) is a German economist, professor at the Department of Economics of the University of Mannheim, and has been president (Rektor) of Mannheim University since October 2012. Previously he was professor of Economics at the Département d'Econométrie et Economie Politique at the University of Lausanne.

== Education ==
He obtained his Ph.D. in Economics at the University of Bonn within the "European Doctoral Program in Economics" in 1991, after having earned an undergraduate degree in mathematics and economics at the Heidelberg University and a M.Phil. at the London School of Economics and Political Science.

== Academics ==
He is Research Fellow at the Center for Economic Policy Research (London), former Resident Fellow of the Center for Advanced Studies in the Behavioral Sciences in Stanford, and was, until 2004, director of the doctoral program of the International Center FAME at the Universities of Lausanne and Geneva. In 2006 he was lead manager of the university's successful graduate school grant application in the German "Initiative of Excellence" and became founding director of the "Graduate School of Economic and Social Sciences" (GESS) at the University of Mannheim. In 2009, he was elected member of the Heidelberg Academy of Sciences. He has been board member of several journals and a former consultant to the World Bank and other international institutions. Currently, he serves, among others, on the Advisory Scientific Committee of the European Systemic Risk Board. His research has mainly covered microeconomic theory, political economy, corporate finance, banking, and international finance.

A major focus of his university presidency was the advancement of graduate education and of junior faculty careers, the development of the private University Foundation, as well as the internationalization and international competitiveness of Mannheim University. In 2016, Mannheim University was the first in the state to adopt formal tenure track rules. Towards the end of his term, the university showed significant progress in international rankings.

== Personal life ==
Ernst-Ludwig von Thadden belongs to the German Uradel family Thadden and is the son of the German author Wiebke von Thadden and the German historian and professor of history at the University of Göttingen, Rudolf von Thadden. His sister is the German linguist and journalist Elisabeth von Thadden.
