= Wielistowo =

Settlement in Kashubia

Wielistowo Wielëstowò
- Hamlet
- Location within Poland
- Coordinates: 54°34′35″N 17°54′29″E
- Country: Poland
- Voivodeship: Pomeranian
- County: Wejherowo
- Gmina: Łęczyce
- Population: 150

Wielistowo [vjɛlisˈtɔvɔ] (Kashubian: Wielëstowò) is a hamlet in the administrative district of Gmina Łęczyce, within Wejherowo County, Pomeranian Voivodeship, in northern Poland.

For details of the history of the region, see History of Pomerania.
