= Łęczyce, Pomeranian Voivodeship =

Łęczyce
- Village
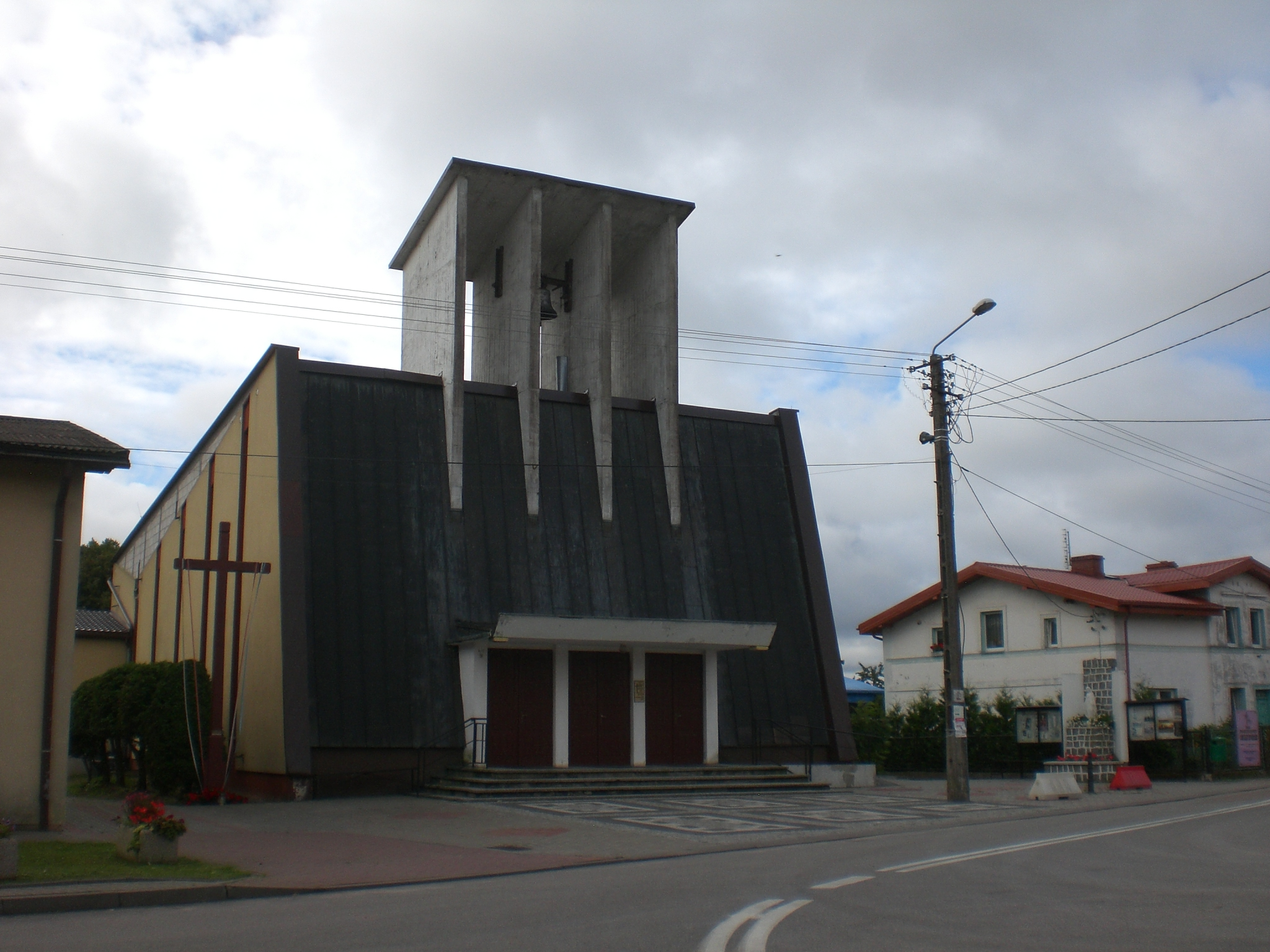
- Church of Saint Anthony of Padua

- Location within Poland
- Coordinates: 54°35′21″N 17°51′39″E
- Country: Poland
- Voivodeship: Pomeranian
- County: Wejherowo
- Gmina: Łęczyce
- Population: 1,990

Łęczyce [wɛnˈt͡ʂɨt͡sɛ] is a village in Wejherowo County, Pomeranian Voivodeship, in northern Poland. It is the seat of the gmina (administrative district) called Gmina Łęczyce.

For details of the history of the region, see History of Pomerania.
