= Borówko =

Settlement in Kashubia

Borówko Bòrowô Môłé
- Colony
- Location within Poland
- Coordinates: 54°31′17″N 17°57′42″E
- Country: Poland
- Voivodeship: Pomeranian
- County: Wejherowo
- Gmina: Łęczyce
- Population: 50

Borówko [bɔˈrufkɔ] (Kashubian: Bòrowô Môłé) is a colony in the administrative district of Gmina Łęczyce, within Wejherowo County, Pomeranian Voivodeship, in northern Poland.

For details of the history of the region, see History of Pomerania.
