= Kaczkowo, Pomeranian Voivodeship =

Village in Kashubia

Kaczkowo Kaczkòwò
- Village
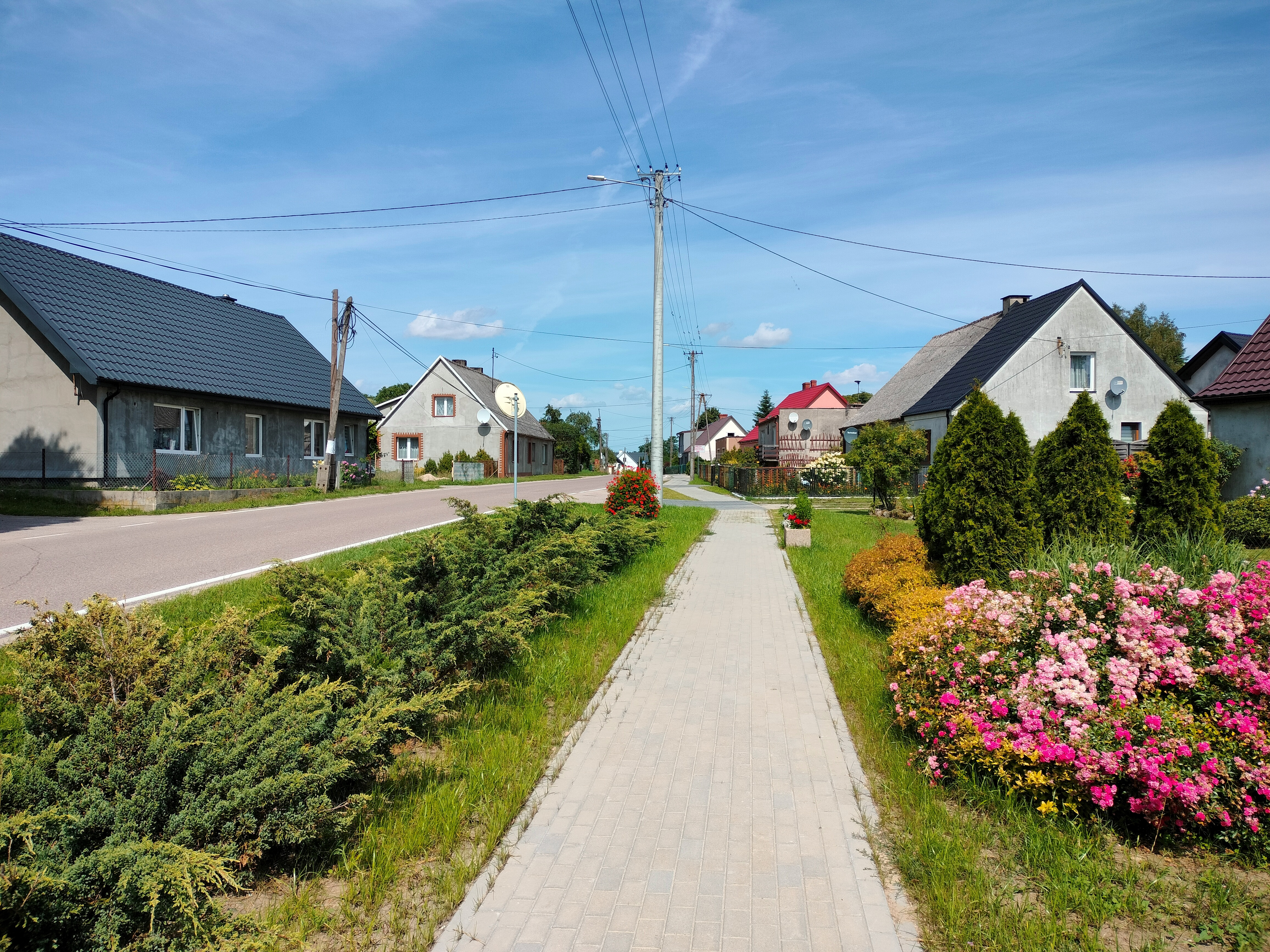

- Location within Poland
- Coordinates: 54°36′13″N 17°52′48″E
- Country: Poland
- Voivodeship: Pomeranian
- County: Wejherowo
- Gmina: Łęczyce
- Population: 332

Kaczkowo [kat͡ʂˈkɔvɔ] (Kashubian: Kaczkòwò) is a village in the administrative district of Gmina Łęczyce, within Wejherowo County, Pomeranian Voivodeship, in northern Poland.

For details of the history of the region, see History of Pomerania.
