= Pużyce =

Village in Kashubia

Pużyce Pużëcé
- Village
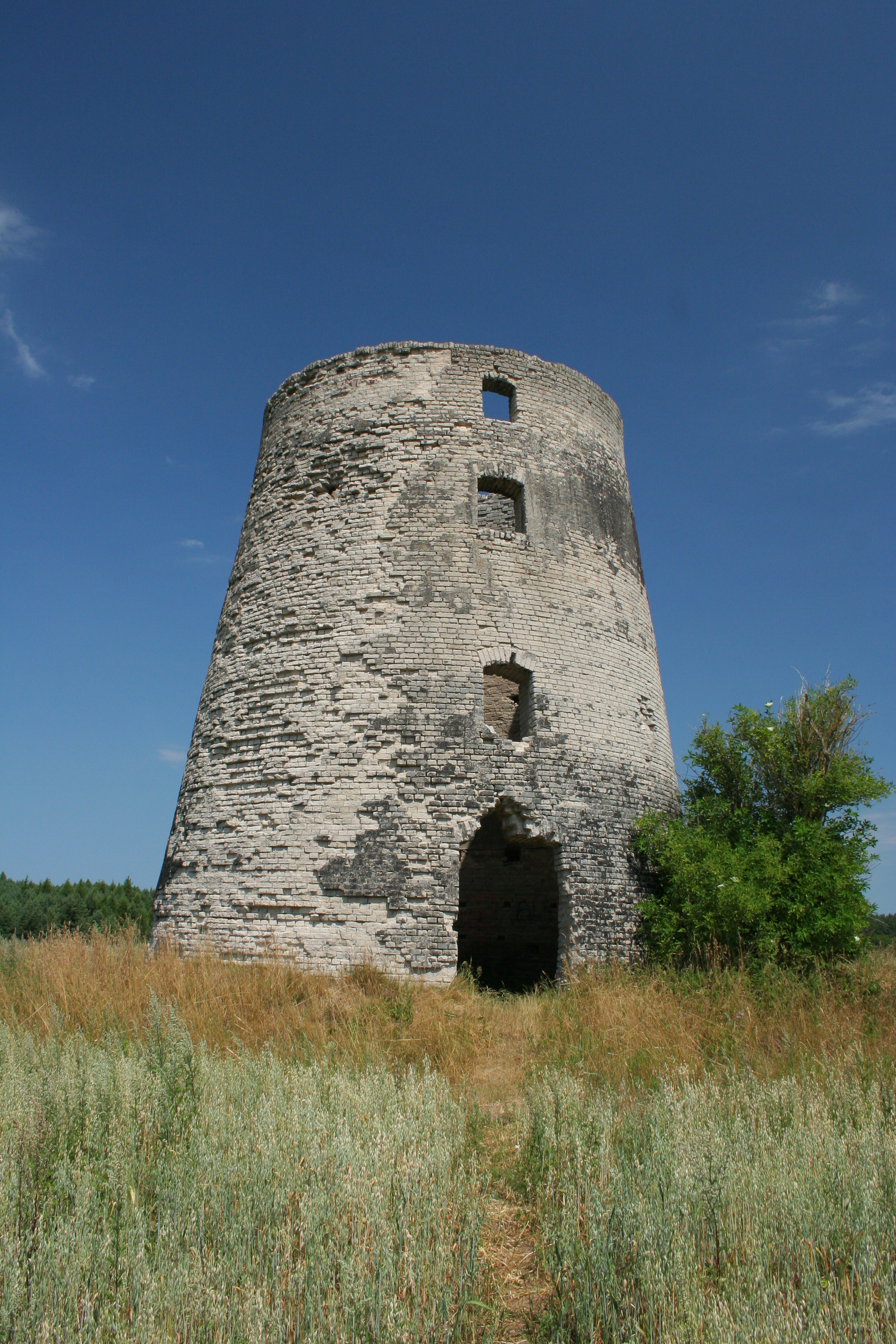
- An abandoned windmill in the vicinity of the village

- Location within Poland
- Coordinates: 54°38′33″N 17°51′1″E
- Country: Poland
- Voivodeship: Pomeranian
- County: Wejherowo
- Gmina: Łęczyce

Pużyce [puˈʐɨt͡sɛ] (Kashubian: Pużëcé) is a village in the administrative district of Gmina Łęczyce, within Wejherowo County, Pomeranian Voivodeship, in northern Poland.

For details of the history of the region, see History of Pomerania.
