= Kisewo =

Village in Kashubia

Kisewo Kisewò
- Village
- Location within Poland
- Coordinates: 54°35′45″N 17°48′57″E
- Country: Poland
- Voivodeship: Pomeranian
- County: Wejherowo
- Gmina: Łęczyce

Kisewo [kiˈsɛvɔ] (Kashubian: Kisewò) is a village in the administrative district of Gmina Łęczyce, within Wejherowo County, Pomeranian Voivodeship, in northern Poland.

For details of the history of the region, see History of Pomerania.
