= Strzebielino, Pomeranian Voivodeship =

Village in Kashubia

Strzebielino Strzebielëno
- Village
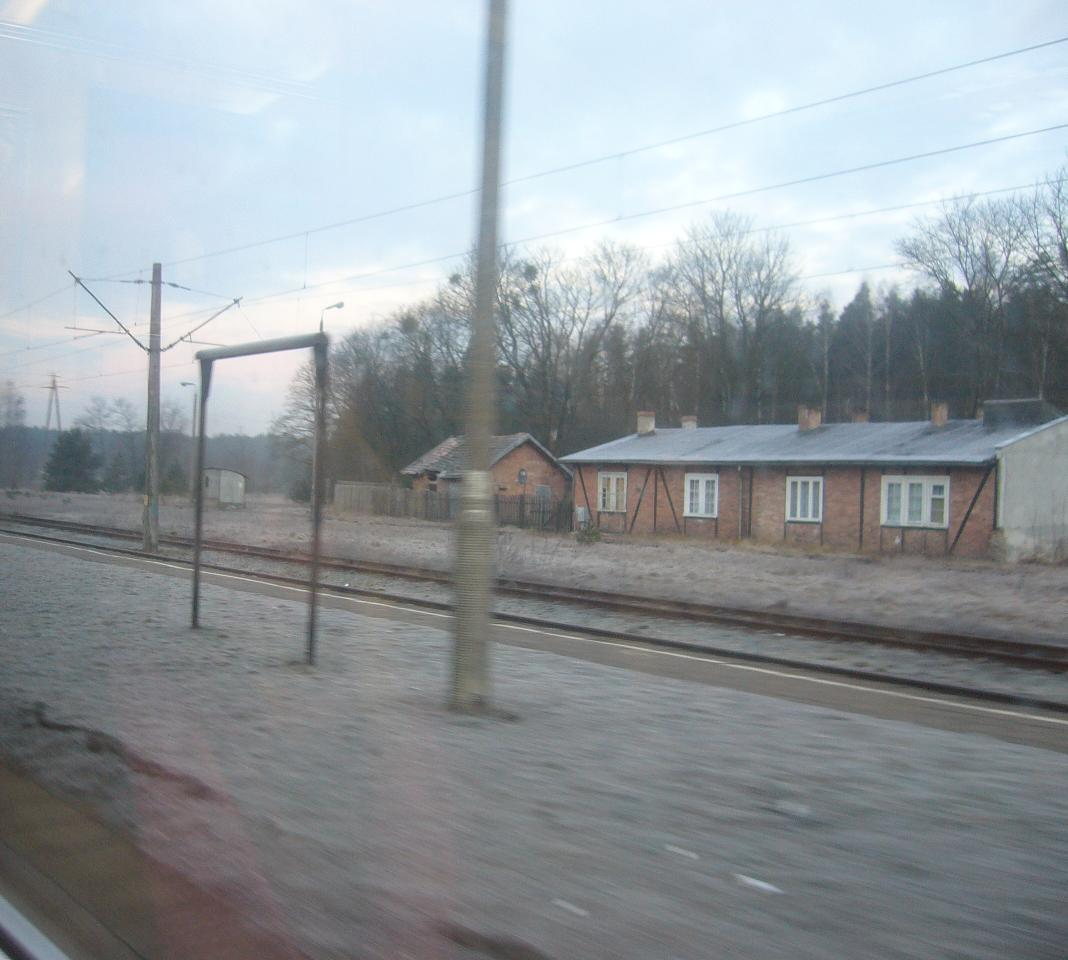
- The local railway station Strzebielino Morskie

- Location within Poland
- Coordinates: 54°34′0″N 18°2′21″E
- Country: Poland
- Voivodeship: Pomeranian
- County: Wejherowo
- Gmina: Łęczyce
- Population: 410

Strzebielino [stʂɛbjɛˈlinɔ] (Kashubian: Strzebielëno) is a village in the administrative district of Gmina Łęczyce, within Wejherowo County, Pomeranian Voivodeship, in northern Poland.

== See also ==
- History of Pomerania, for the history of the region.
