= Rozłazinko =

Settlement in Kashubia

Rozłazinko Nowé Rozłazëno
- Przysiółek
- Location within Poland
- Coordinates: 54°32′19″N 17°54′9″E
- Country: Poland
- Voivodeship: Pomeranian
- County: Wejherowo
- Gmina: Łęczyce

Rozłazinko [rɔzwaˈʑinkɔ] (Kashubian: Nowé Rozłazëno) is a przysiółek in the administrative district of Gmina Łęczyce, within Wejherowo County, Pomeranian Voivodeship, in northern Poland.

For details of the history of the region, see History of Pomerania.
