= Strzelęcino =

Village in Kashubia

Strzelęcino Strzélencënò
- Village
- Location within Poland
- Coordinates: 54°36′17″N 17°47′55″E
- Country: Poland
- Voivodeship: Pomeranian
- County: Wejherowo
- Gmina: Łęczyce
- Population: 142

Strzelęcino [stʂɛlɛnˈt͡ɕinɔ] (Kashubian: Strzélencënò) is a village in the administrative district of Gmina Łęczyce, within Wejherowo County, Pomeranian Voivodeship, in northern Poland.

For details of the history of the region, see History of Pomerania.
