= Bożepole Małe =

Village in Kashubia

Bożepole Małe Môłé Bòżé Pòlé
- Village
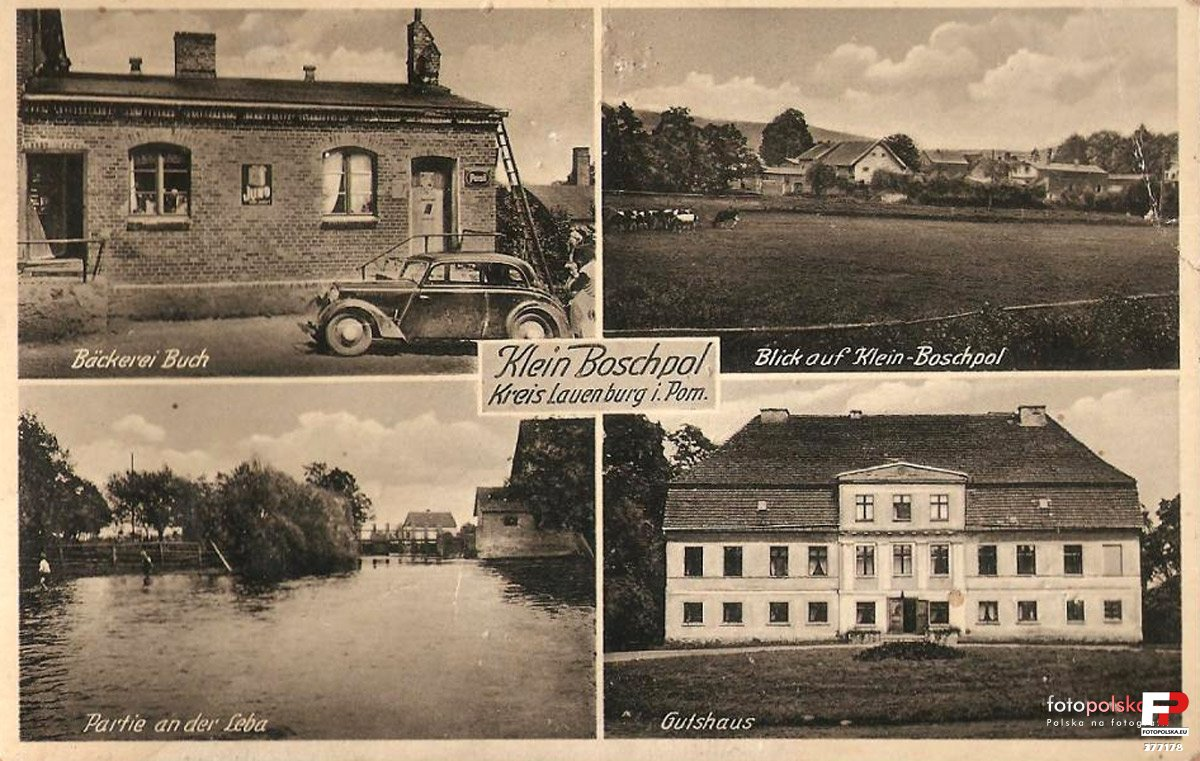
- A postcard showing images of the village, c. 1930

- Location within Poland
- Coordinates: 54°33′51″N 17°59′0″E
- Country: Poland
- Voivodeship: Pomeranian
- County: Wejherowo
- Gmina: Łęczyce
- Population: 410

Bożepole Małe [bɔʐɛˈpɔlɛ ˈmawɛ] (Kashubian: Môłé Bòżé Pòlé; German: Klein Boschpol) is a village in the administrative district of Gmina Łęczyce, within Wejherowo County, Pomeranian Voivodeship, in northern Poland.

For details of the history of the region, see History of Pomerania.
