= Lębork Mosty railway station =

Railway station in Pomerania, Poland

Lębork Mosty

General information
- Location: Długa 7b, Mosty; Poland
- Coordinates: 54.5503257°N 17.7910925°E
- Owner: PKP Polskie Linie Kolejowe
- Line: 202: Gdańsk Główny–Stargard railway
- Platforms: 1

Services
Preceding station	Polregio	Following station
Lębork towards Słupsk	PR	Godętowo towards Tczew
Lębork towards Słupsk	PR	Godętowo towards Malbork
Lębork towards Słupsk	PR	Godętowo towards Elbląg
Lębork towards Słupsk	PR	Godętowo towards Smętowo, Laskowice Pomorskie, or Bydgoszcz Główna
Lębork towards Słupsk	PR	Godętowo towards Gdynia Główna
Preceding station	SKM Tricity	Following station
Lębork Terminus	SKM Tricity	Godętowo towards Gdańsk Śródmieście
Location

Lębork Mosty is a PKP railway station in Mosty (Pomeranian Voivodeship), Poland, on the Eastern end of the town of Lębork.

== Lines crossing the station ==
Start station	End station	Line type
Gdańsk Główny	Stargard Szczeciński	Passenger/Freight

== Train services ==
The station is served by the following services:

- Regional services (R) Tczew — Słupsk
- Regional services (R) Malbork — Słupsk
- Regional services (R) Elbląg — Słupsk
- Regional services (R) Słupsk — Bydgoszcz Główna
- Regional services (R) Słupsk — Gdynia Główna
- Szybka Kolej Miejska services (SKM) (Lebork -) Wejherowo - Reda - Rumia - Gdynia - Sopot - Gdansk
