= Gmina Łęczyce =

Gmina Łęczyce Łęczyce Commune
- Gmina
- Coat of arms
- Interactive map of Gmina Łęczyce
- Coordinates (Łęczyce): 54°35′21″N 17°51′39″E
- Country: Poland
- Voivodeship: Pomeranian
- County: Wejherowo
- Seat: Łęczyce

Area
  - Total: 232.81 km^{2} (89.89 sq mi)

Population (2006)
  - Total: 11,217
  - Density: 48.181/km^{2} (124.79/sq mi)
- Website: http://www.leczyce.com.pl

Gmina Łęczyce (Kashubian: Łãczëcë) is a rural gmina (administrative district) in Wejherowo County, Pomeranian Voivodeship, in northern Poland. Its seat is the village of Łęczyce, which lies approximately 26 kilometres (16 mi) west of Wejherowo and 56 km (35 mi) north-west of the regional capital Gdańsk.

The gmina covers an area of 232.81 square kilometres (89.9 sq mi), and as of 2006 its total population is 11,217.

== Villages ==
Gmina Łęczyce contains the villages and settlements of Borówko, Bożepole Małe, Bożepole Wielkie, Brzeźno Lęborskie, Chmieleniec, Chrzanowo, Dąbrówka Brzezińska, Dąbrówka Wielka, Dzięcielec, Godętowo, Jeżewo, Kaczkowo, Kisewo, Łęczyce, Łęczyn, Łówcz Górny, Mokry Bór, Nawcz, Nowy Dwór, Paraszyno, Pużyce, Redystowo, Rozłazinko, Rozłazino, Strzebielino, Strzebielino-Wieś, Strzelęcino, Świchowo, Świetlino, Węgornia, Wielistowo, Witków and Wysokie.

== Neighbouring gminas ==
Gmina Łęczyce is bordered by the gminas of Cewice, Choczewo, Gniewino, Linia, Luzino and Nowa Wieś Lęborska.
