= Nowy Dwór, Gmina Łęczyce =

Settlement in Kashubia

Nowy Dwór Nòwë Dwòr
- Settlement
- Location within Poland
- Coordinates: 54°35′44″N 18°0′13″E
- Country: Poland
- Voivodeship: Pomeranian
- County: Wejherowo
- Gmina: Łęczyce

Nowy Dwór [ˈnɔvɨ ˈdvur] (Kashubian: Nòwë Dwòr) is a settlement in the administrative district of Gmina Łęczyce, within Wejherowo County, Pomeranian Voivodeship, in northern Poland.

For details of the history of the region, see History of Pomerania.
