= Mokry Bór, Pomeranian Voivodeship =

Settlement in Kashubia

Mokry Bór Mòkrë Bòr
- Settlement
- Location within Poland
- Coordinates: 54°35′4″N 18°0′23″E
- Country: Poland
- Voivodeship: Pomeranian
- County: Wejherowo
- Gmina: Łęczyce

Mokry Bór (Polish: [ˈmɔkrɨ ˈbur]; Kashubian: Mòkrë Bòr) is a settlement in the administrative district of Gmina Łęczyce, within Wejherowo County, Pomeranian Voivodeship, in northern Poland.

For details of the history of the region, see History of Pomerania.
