= Bożepole Wielkie =

Village in Kashubia

Bożepole Wielkie Wiôldżé Bòżé Pòlé
- Village
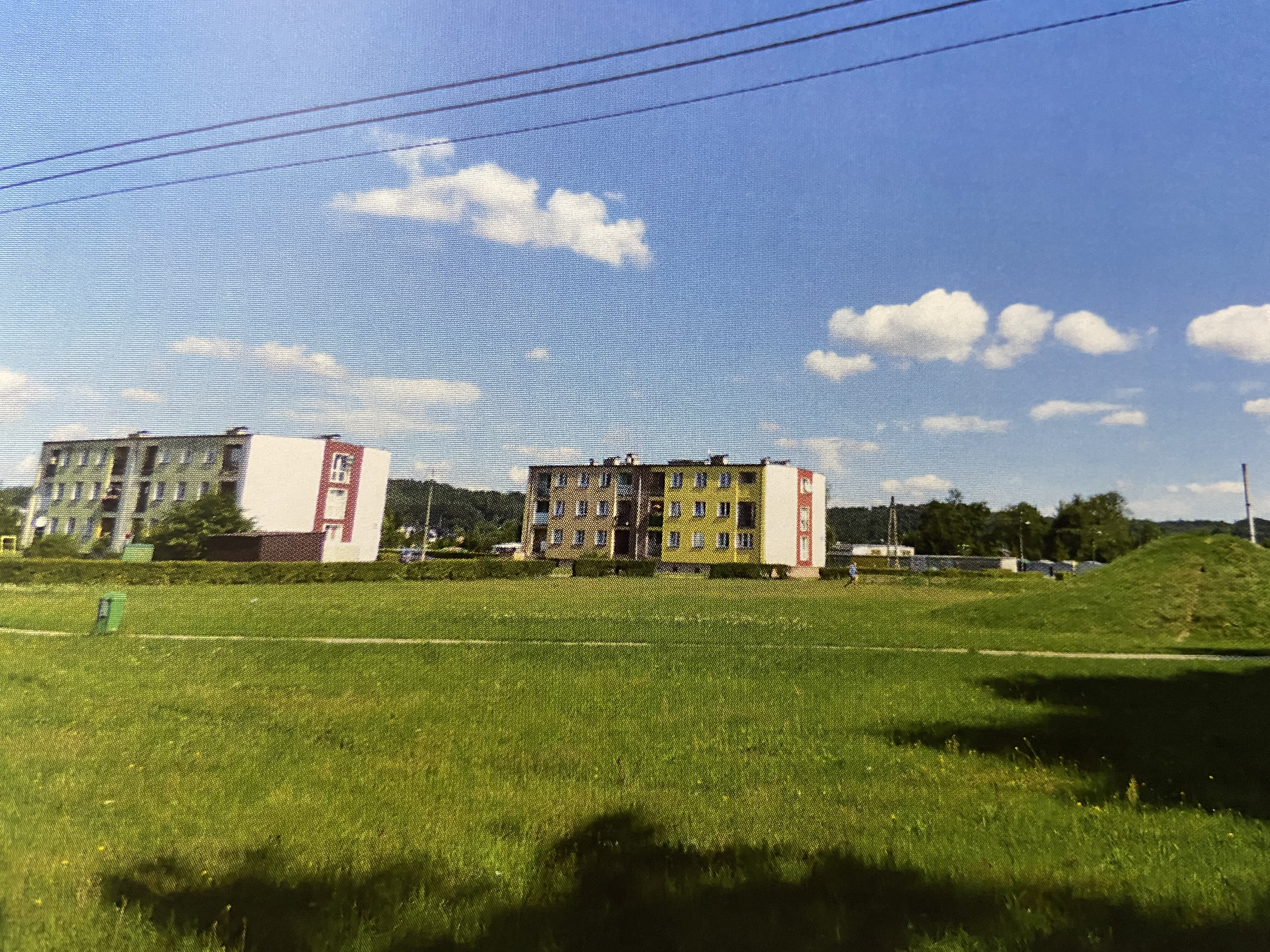
- Former PGR flats in the village

- Location within Poland
- Coordinates: 54°34′33″N 17°58′8″E
- Country: Poland
- Voivodeship: Pomeranian
- County: Wejherowo
- Gmina: Łęczyce
- Population: 2,089
- Website: bozepole.pl

Bożepole Wielkie [bɔʐɛˈpɔlɛ ˈvjɛlkʲɛ] (Kashubian: Wiôldżé Bòżé Pòlé; German: Groß Boschpol) is a village in the administrative district of Gmina Łęczyce, within Wejherowo County, Pomeranian Voivodeship, in northern Poland.

== Transport ==
The S6 expressway bypasses Bożepole Wielkie to the south. Exit 47 of the S6 expressway allows for quick access to Gdańsk, Gdynia and Sopot.

The village is served by Bożepole Wielkie railway station.
