= Łówcz Górny =

Village in Kashubia

Łówcz Górny Łówcz
- Village
- Location within Poland
- Coordinates: 54°30′44″N 17°58′34″E
- Country: Poland
- Voivodeship: Pomeranian
- County: Wejherowo
- Gmina: Łęczyce

Łówcz Górny [ˈwuft͡ʂ ˈɡurnɨ] (Kashubian: Łówcz) is a village in the administrative district of Gmina Łęczyce, within Wejherowo County, Pomeranian Voivodeship, in northern Poland.

For details of the history of the region, see History of Pomerania.
