= Witków, Pomeranian Voivodeship =

Witków
- Village
- Location within Poland
- Coordinates: 54°39′35″N 17°53′57″E
- Country: Poland
- Voivodeship: Pomeranian
- County: Wejherowo
- Gmina: Łęczyce
- Population: 70

Witków [ˈvitkuf] is a village in the administrative district of Gmina Łęczyce, within Wejherowo County, Pomeranian Voivodeship, in northern Poland.

For details of the history of the region, see History of Pomerania.
