= Dąbrówka Wielka, Pomeranian Voivodeship =

Village in Kashubia

Dąbrówka Wielka Wiôlgô Dãbrowka
- Village
- Location within Poland
- Coordinates: 54°32′49″N 17°51′45″E
- Country: Poland
- Voivodeship: Pomeranian
- County: Wejherowo
- Gmina: Łęczyce
- Population: 42

Dąbrówka Wielka [dɔmˈbrufka ˈvjɛlka] (Kashubian: Wiôlgô Dãbrowka) is a village in the administrative district of Gmina Łęczyce, within Wejherowo County, Pomeranian Voivodeship, in northern Poland.

For details of the history of the region, see History of Pomerania.
