= Węgornia =

Settlement in Kashubia

Węgornia Wãgòrniô
- Hamlet
- Location within Poland
- Coordinates: 54°34′0″N 17°49′51″E
- Country: Poland
- Voivodeship: Pomeranian
- County: Wejherowo
- Gmina: Łęczyce

Węgornia [vɛnˈɡɔrɲa] (Kashubian: Wãgòrniô) is a hamlet in the administrative district of Gmina Łęczyce, within Wejherowo County, Pomeranian Voivodeship, in northern Poland.

For details of the history of the region, see History of Pomerania.
