= Jeżewo, Pomeranian Voivodeship =

Settlement in Kashubia

Jeżewo Jéżéwò
- Hamlet
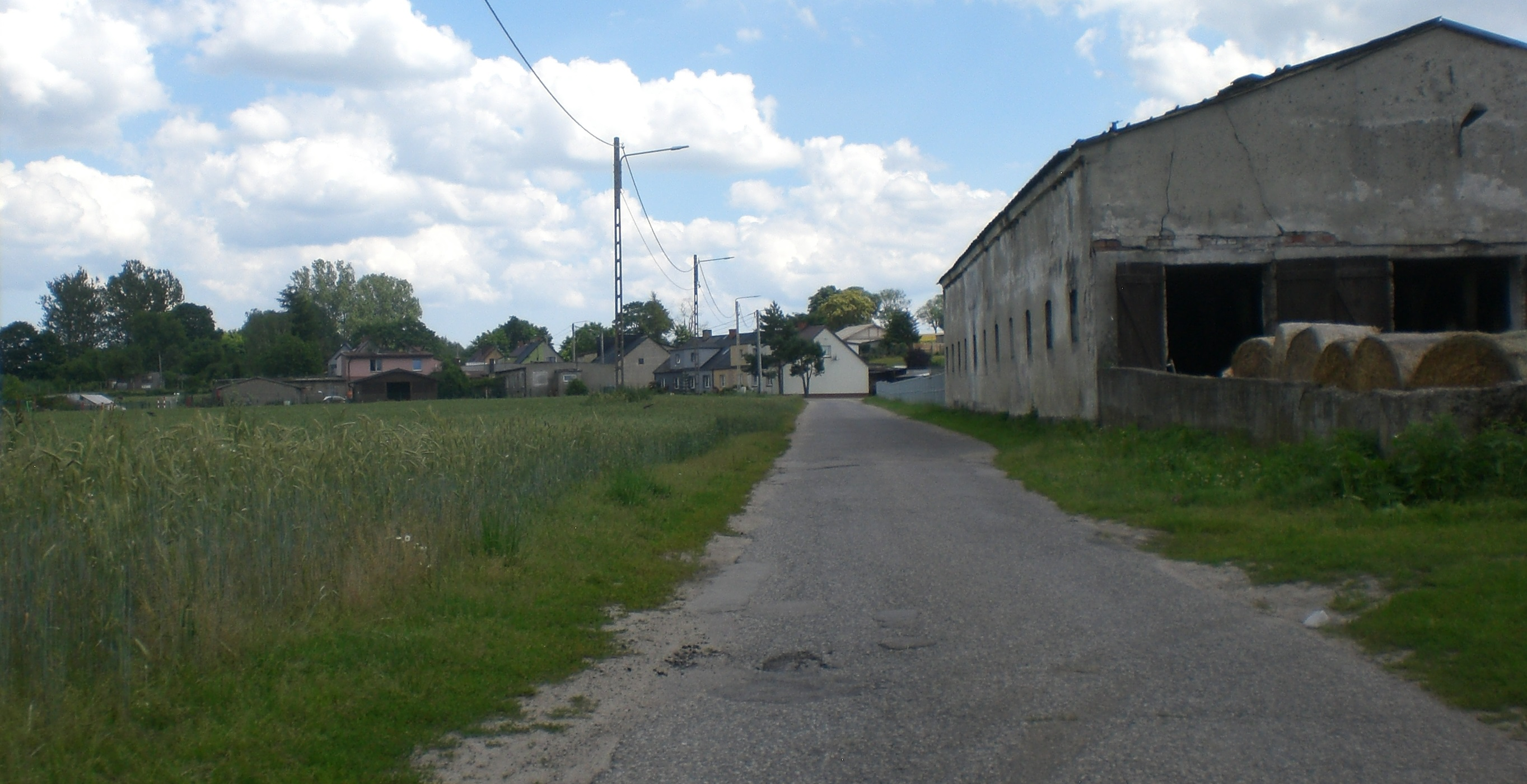

- Location within Poland
- Coordinates: 54°31′33″N 17°56′7″E
- Country: Poland
- Voivodeship: Pomeranian
- County: Wejherowo
- Gmina: Łęczyce
- Population: 120

Jeżewo [jɛˈʐɛvɔ] (Kashubian: Jéżéwò) is a hamlet in the administrative district of Gmina Łęczyce, within Wejherowo County, Pomeranian Voivodeship, in northern Poland.

For details of the history of the region, see History of Pomerania.
