= Gościcino =

Village in Kashubia

Gościcino Gòscëcëno
- Village
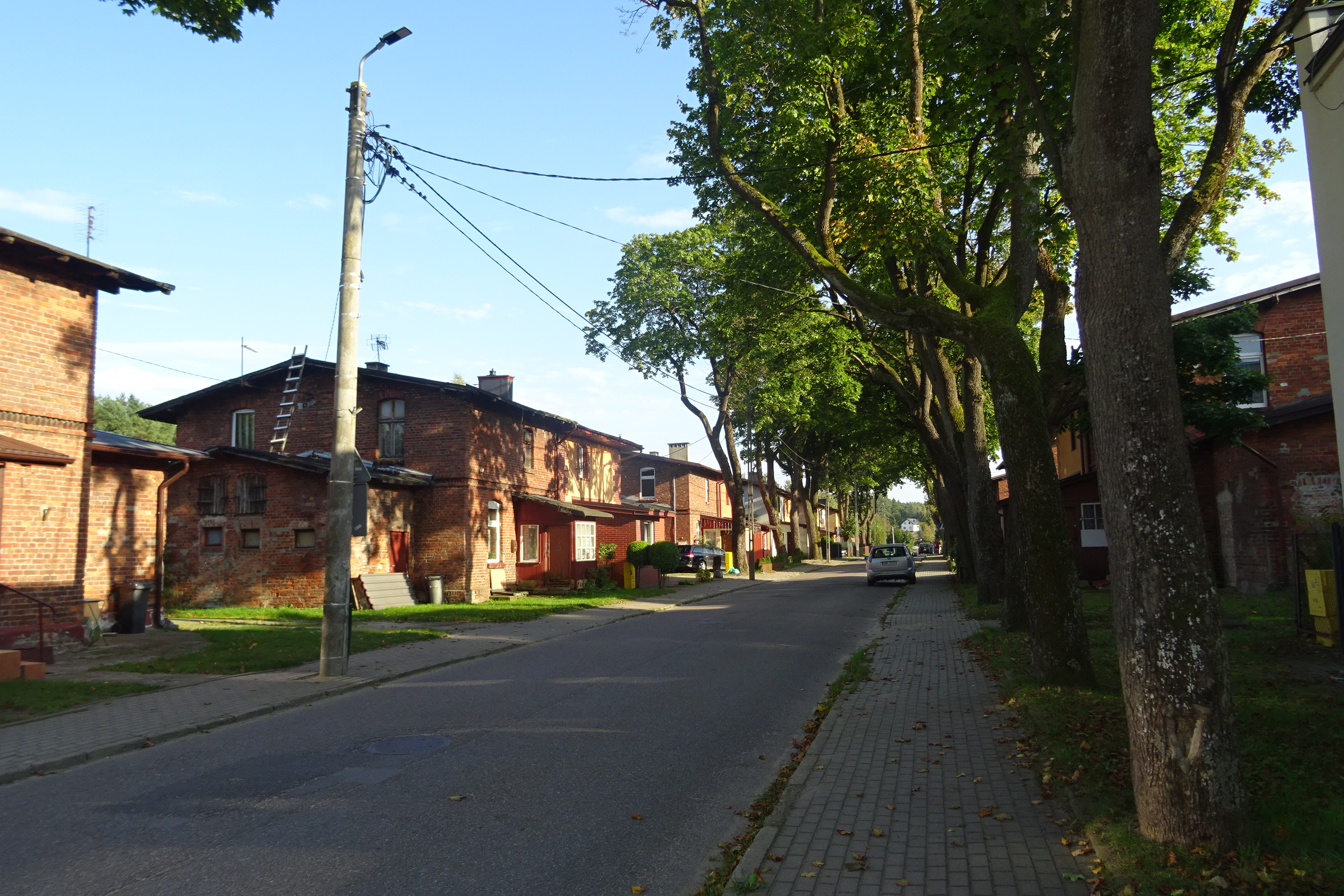

- Location within Poland
- Coordinates: 54°36′16″N 18°9′19″E
- Country: Poland
- Voivodeship: Pomeranian
- County: Wejherowo
- Gmina: Wejherowo
- Population: 5,278

Gościcino (Polish: [ɡɔɕt͡ɕiˈt͡ɕinɔ]; Kashubian: Gòscëcëno) is a village in the administrative district of Gmina Wejherowo, within Wejherowo County, Pomeranian Voivodeship, in northern Poland.

For details of the history of the region, see History of Pomerania.
