= Rozłazino, Pomeranian Voivodeship =

Village in Kashubia

Rozłazino Rozłazëno
- Village
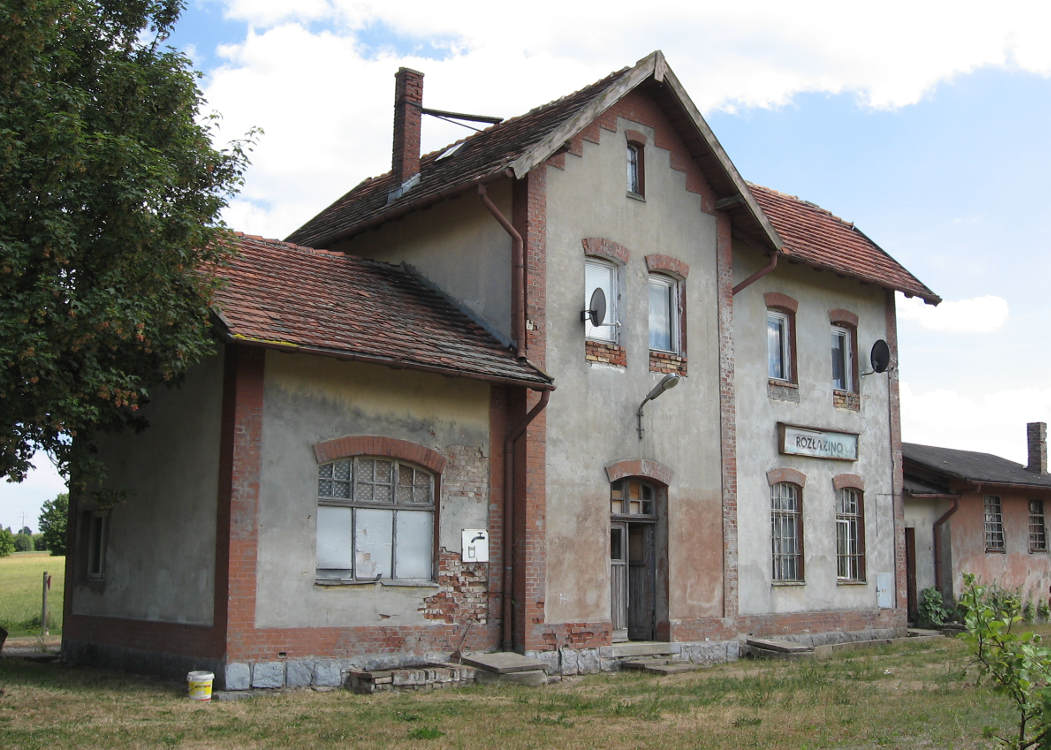
- The local railway station

- Location within Poland
- Coordinates: 54°31′50″N 17°54′47″E
- Country: Poland
- Voivodeship: Pomeranian
- County: Wejherowo
- Gmina: Łęczyce
- Population: 887

Rozłazino [rɔzwaˈʑinɔ] (Kashubian: Rozłazëno) is a village in the administrative district of Gmina Łęczyce, within Wejherowo County, Pomeranian Voivodeship, in northern Poland.

The first mention of the village dates back to 1356 and refers to the location of this village and the building of a church in a document issued by the commander of Danzig, Schwede von Pfelland.

In 1922 - 1923 two stained-glass windows with Kashubian, Polish and German names and the dates of the deaths of 58 parishioners who died in the First World War were installed in the presbytery of the church.

In March 1945, the then German village was occupied by the Red Army. Soviet soldiers commit many rapes, and about a dozen Rozłazin residents are murdered. In addition, several nearby buildings are burned down. In 1945 there were expulsions of the German population, with special emphasis on the Protestant population by the new Polish authorities and the influx of the Catholic Polish population in their place, as well as the takeover of the former German private property and Protestant churches. On March 15, 1947, the name of the village was changed from Roslasin to Rozłazino.

At the turn of the 20th and 21st century a new school was built behind the old school building. Currently there is a new elementary school and a kindergarten in Rozłazino in the same building. In 2013-2014 a bell tower has been built next to the church.

For details of the history of the region, see History of Pomerania.
