= Dzięcielec =

Village in Kashubia

Dzięcielec Dzëcélcz
- Village
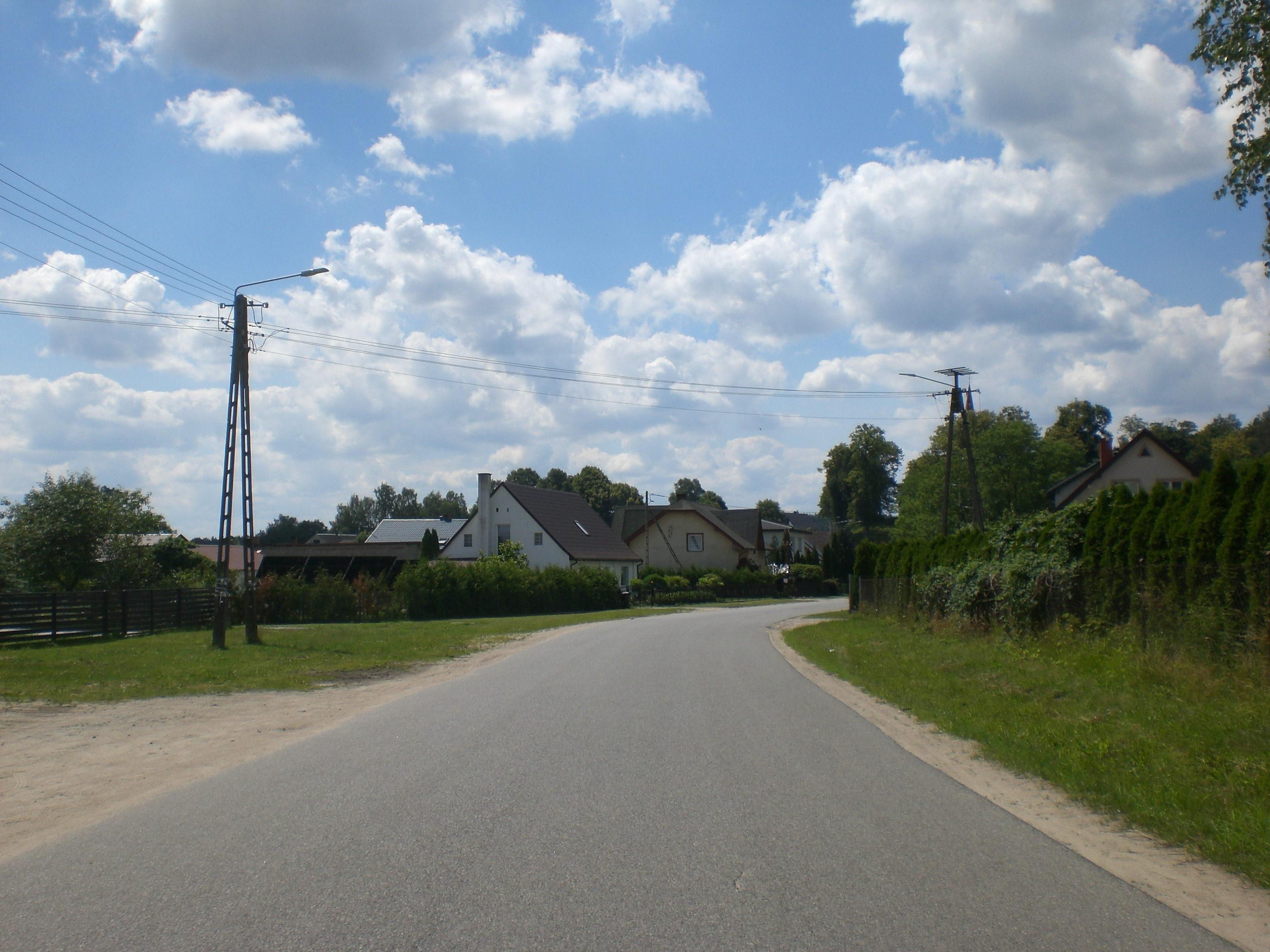

- Location within Poland
- Coordinates: 54°29′58″N 17°54′42″E
- Country: Poland
- Voivodeship: Pomeranian
- County: Wejherowo
- Gmina: Łęczyce
- Population: 303

Dzięcielec [d͡ʑɛnˈt͡ɕɛlɛt͡s] (Kashubian: Dzëcélcz) is a village in the administrative district of Gmina Łęczyce, within Wejherowo County, Pomeranian Voivodeship, in northern Poland.

For details of the history of the region, see History of Pomerania.
