= Nawcz =

Village in Kashubia

Nawcz Nôwcz
- Village
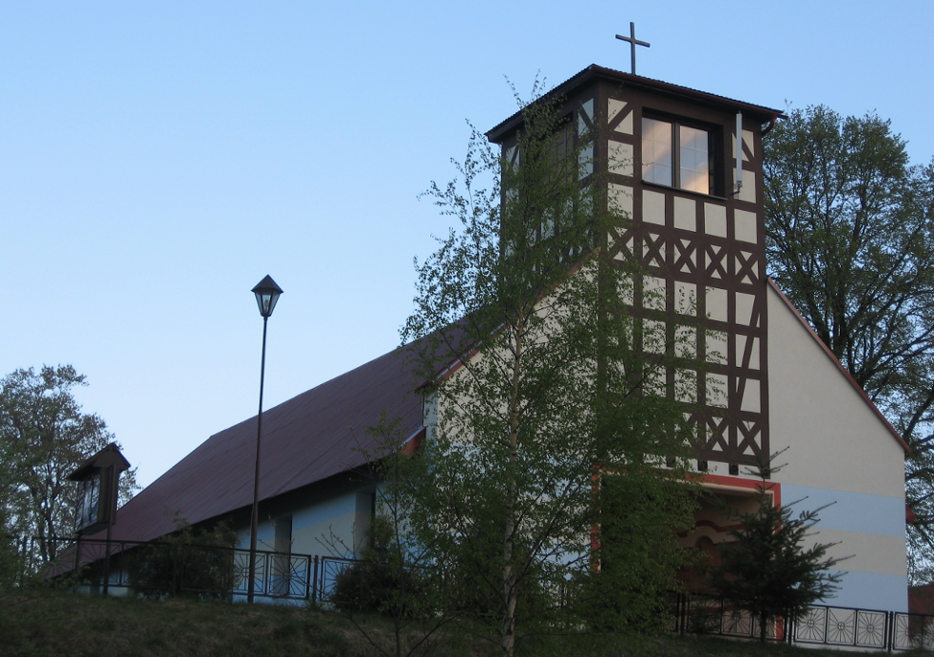
- Church in Nawcz

- Location within Poland
- Coordinates: 54°30′19″N 17°56′32″E
- Country: Poland
- Voivodeship: Pomeranian
- County: Wejherowo
- Gmina: Łęczyce
- Population: 252

Nawcz [naft͡ʂ] (Kashubian: Nôwcz) is a village in the administrative district of Gmina Łęczyce, within Wejherowo County, Pomeranian Voivodeship, in northern Poland.

For details of the history of the region, see History of Pomerania.

== Forced-labour camp ==
During the occupation of Poland by the Third Reich in World War II, the village was the location of the forced-labour camp Nawitz, set up as one of 40 subcamps of the notorious Nazi German Stutthof concentration camp near Gdańsk.
