= Godętowo =

Village in Kashubia

Godętowo Gòjtowò
- Hamlet
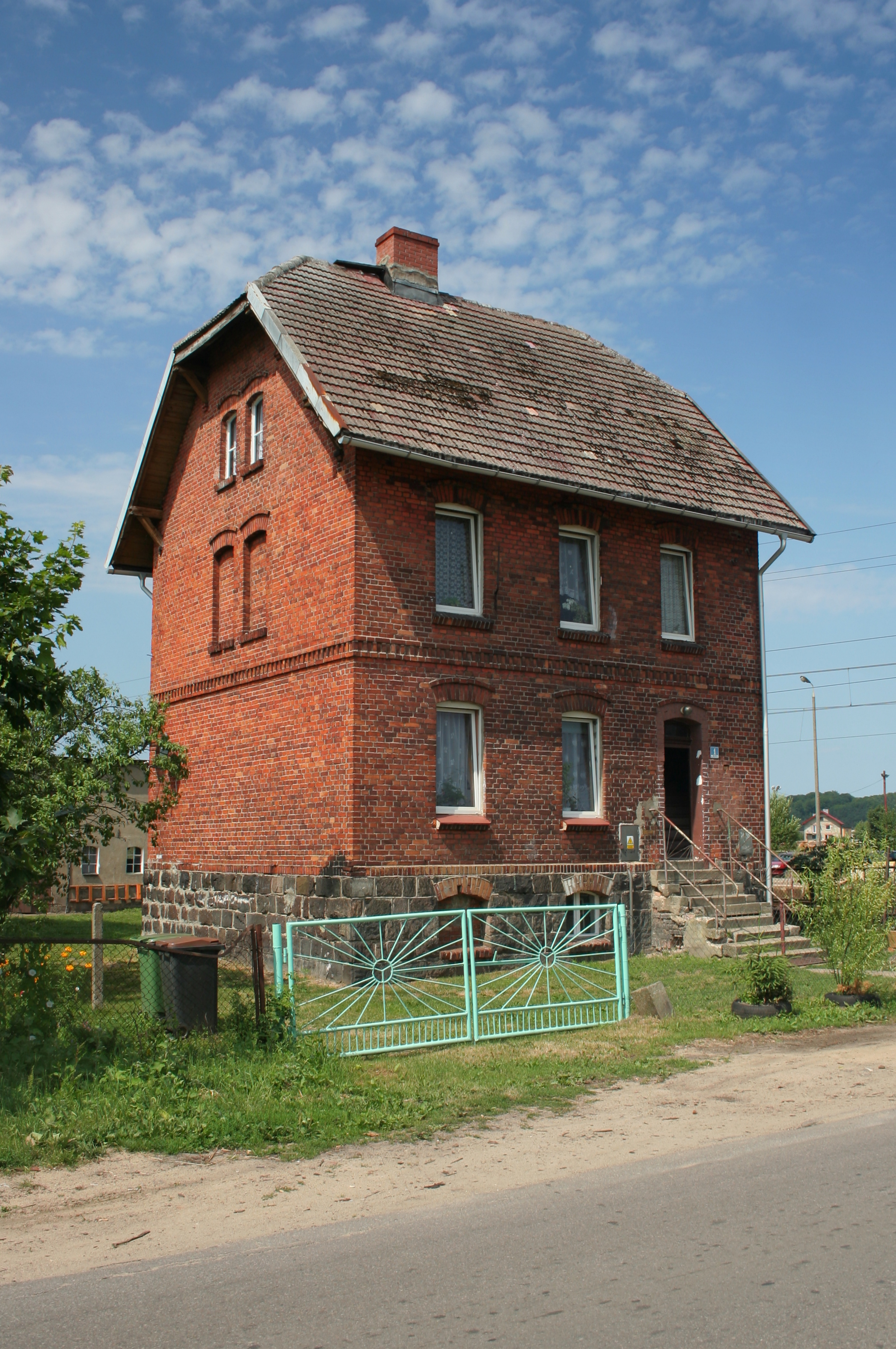

- Location within Poland
- Coordinates: 54°34′26″N 17°52′5″E
- Country: Poland
- Voivodeship: Pomeranian
- County: Wejherowo
- Gmina: Łęczyce
- Population: 216

Godętowo [ɡɔdɛnˈtɔvɔ] (Kashubian: Gòjtowò; German: Goddentow) is a hamlet in the administrative district of Gmina Łęczyce, within Wejherowo County, Pomeranian Voivodeship, in northern Poland.

For details of the history of the region, see History of Pomerania.
