= Lębork railway station =

Railway station in Lębork, Poland

Lębork
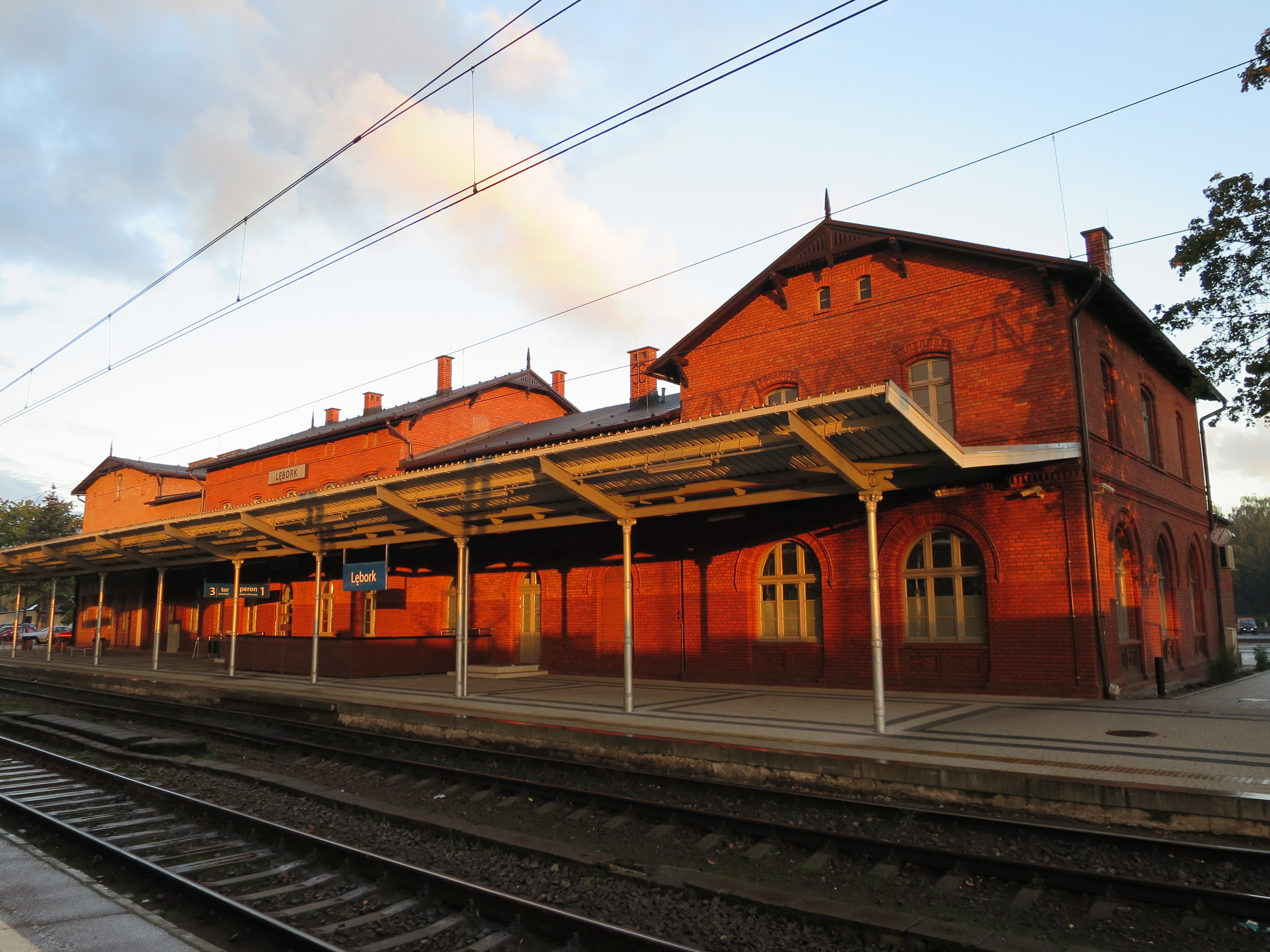
- Lębork railway station

General information
- Location: Lębork, Pomeranian Voivodeship; Poland
- System: Railway Station
- Operator: PKP Polskie Linie Kolejowe
- Lines: 202: Gdańsk Główny–Stargard railway 229: Pruszcz Gdański–Łeba railway (closed); 229: Lębork–Bytów railway (closed)

History
- Opened: 1870; 156 years ago
Location
- Location within Poland

Lębork railway station is a railway station serving the town of Lębork, in the Pomeranian Voivodeship, Poland. The station opened in 1870 and is located on the Gdańsk–Stargard railway. The train services are operated by PKP, Polregio and SKM Tricity.

The town and the station used to be known as Lauenburg (Pommern) until 1945.

== History ==
The line from Gdańsk to Słupsk reached Lębork in 1870 as a single track, standard gauge rail line. The line was electrified in 1989. In 1899 Lębork was connection with Łeba and in 1905 with Kartuzy. This second line was closed in the period between 1920 and 1939. It was closed for good in 2000 and since 2004 the line has been unavailable for transport. The connection with Bytów which opened in 1902 and closed in 2003.

== Station buildings ==
Lębork station building

The station building is an old brick building, still fully operational. The ticket office is present and working. Lębork station has two water towers and a signal box.

== Modernisation ==
In April 2013 work began on a thorough modernisation of the railway station. The station building and surrounding area underwent complete refurbishment. The modernisation was completed in June 2014. Construction of the underground passage from platform 3 to the street behind the station is planned.

== Train services ==
The station is served by the following services:

- Express Intercity Premium services (EIP) Kołobrzeg - Gdynia - Warsaw - Kraków
- Intercity services (IC) Łódź Fabryczna — Warszawa — Gdańsk Glowny — Kołobrzeg
- Intercity services (IC) Szczecin - Koszalin - Słupsk - Gdynia - Gdańsk
- Intercity services (IC) Szczecin - Koszalin - Słupsk - Gdynia - Gdańsk - Elbląg/Iława - Olsztyn
- Intercity services (IC) Szczecin - Koszalin - Słupsk - Gdynia - Gdańsk - Elbląg - Olsztyn - Białystok
- Intercity services (TLK) Kołobrzeg — Gdynia Główna — Warszawa Wschodnia — Kraków Główny
- Regional services (R) Tczew — Słupsk
- Regional services (R) Malbork — Słupsk
- Regional services (R) Elbląg — Słupsk
- Regional services (R) Słupsk — Bydgoszcz Główna
- Regional services (R) Słupsk — Gdynia Główna
- Szybka Kolej Miejska services (SKM) (Lębork -) Wejherowo - Reda - Rumia - Gdynia - Sopot - Gdansk

Preceding station	PKP Intercity	Following station
Słupsk towards Kołobrzeg	EIP	Gdynia Główna towards Kraków Główny
Słupsk towards Kołobrzeg	IC	Wejherowo towards Łódź Fabryczna
Słupsk towards Szczecin Główny	IC	Wejherowo towards Gdańsk Główny
Słupsk towards Szczecin Główny	IC	Wejherowo towards Olsztyn Główny
Słupsk towards Szczecin Główny	IC	Wejherowo towards Białystok
Słupsk towards Kołobrzeg	TLK	Wejherowo towards Kraków Główny
Preceding station	Polregio	Following station
Leśnice towards Słupsk	PR	Lębork Mosty towards Tczew
Leśnice towards Słupsk	PR	Lębork Mosty towards Malbork
Leśnice towards Słupsk	PR	Lębork Mosty towards Elbląg
Leśnice towards Słupsk	PR	Lębork Mosty towards Smętowo, Laskowice Pomorskie, or Bydgoszcz Główna
Leśnice towards Słupsk	PR	Lębork Mosty towards Gdynia Główna
Preceding station	SKM Tricity	Following station
Terminus	SKM Tricity	Lębork Mosty towards Gdańsk Śródmieście

== See also ==
- Lębork
