= Coat of arms of Mecklenburg-Vorpommern =

Coat of arms of the German state of Mecklenburg-Vorpommern

Versions
- Lesser coat of arms
- Armiger: Government of Mecklenburg-Vorpommern
- Adopted: 1990
- Shield: Quarterly. One and four Or, a bull's head erased Sables, langued Gules, horned Argent, crowned Or. Two Argent a griffin segreant left, armed Or. Three Argent an eagle Gules armed and beaked Or, langued Gules. The wings charged with a trefoil Or.
- Use: Great arms for use by parliament and superior state authorities, lesser arms for lower state authorities.

Mecklenburg-Vorpommern is a state of Germany. The greater arms of the state depict the bull's head of Mecklenburg, the griffin of Pomerania, and the red eagle of Brandenburg. The lesser arms depict only the bull's head of Mecklenburg and the griffin of Pomerania.

== History ==
The symbols used in the coat of arms go back to at least the Middle Ages, when they were used by the Dukes of Mecklenburg, Dukes of Pomerania and Margraves of Brandenburg. However, the arms of the dukes were somewhat more complex as they also included many "quarterings" representing subordinate titles, many of which are still used by their modern counterparts. This complexity was retained by the Mecklenburgian arms until the dissolution of the Free States of Mecklenburg-Schwerin and Mecklenburg-Strelitz under Nazi rule.

The complex Pomeranian arms lasted until the extinction of the ducal line in the 17th century. Both Swedish Pomerania and the Brandenburgian/Prussian province of Pomerania used only the griffin as their emblems, as did the reconstituted post-1815 Prussian province, which existed (officially) until 1945. During the interwar period a crowned red sinister (i.e. looking towards the viewer's right) griffin was also used for the Polish Pomeranian Voivodeship, which lay between the Prussian provinces of Pomerania and East Prussia (i.e. Pomeralia), forming the Polish corridor. After 1945 the portion of Prussian Pomerania east of the Oder-Neisse line (Farther Pomerania, Hinterpommern in German) was ceded to Poland. Today, in addition to the German Vorpommern, the red griffin is used as the coat of arms of the Polish West Pomeranian Voivodeship, which corresponds roughly to western Farther Pomerania; the more eastern Pomeranian Voivodeship, which corresponds roughly to the remainder of Farther Pomerania and Pomeralia uses a black griffin on gold.

The Brandenburg eagle is also used as the symbol of the German state of Brandenburg. For further information, see Coat of arms of Brandenburg.

The coat of arms of the Grand Duchy of Mecklenburg-Schwerin. The Mecklenburg bull can be seen in the top left of the shield.

The coat of arms of the Grand Duchy of Mecklenburg-Strelitz. The escutcheon is identical to that of Mecklenburg-Schwerin.

The Pomeranian ducal arms used until the 17th century. The red Pomeranian griffin can be seen in the top centre.

The Pomeranian griffin as used on the arms of the Prussian Province of Pomerania.

The seal of Mecklenburg-Vorpommern until the dissolution and reorganisation of the state into districts in 1952.

== Parts ==
Mecklenburg

Pomerania

Brandenburg

== See also ==
- Coat of arms of Prussia
- Coat of arms of Germany
- Origin of the coats of arms of German federal states.
- Coat of arms of the West Pomeranian Voivodeship
