= Bear in heraldry =

Heraldic animal

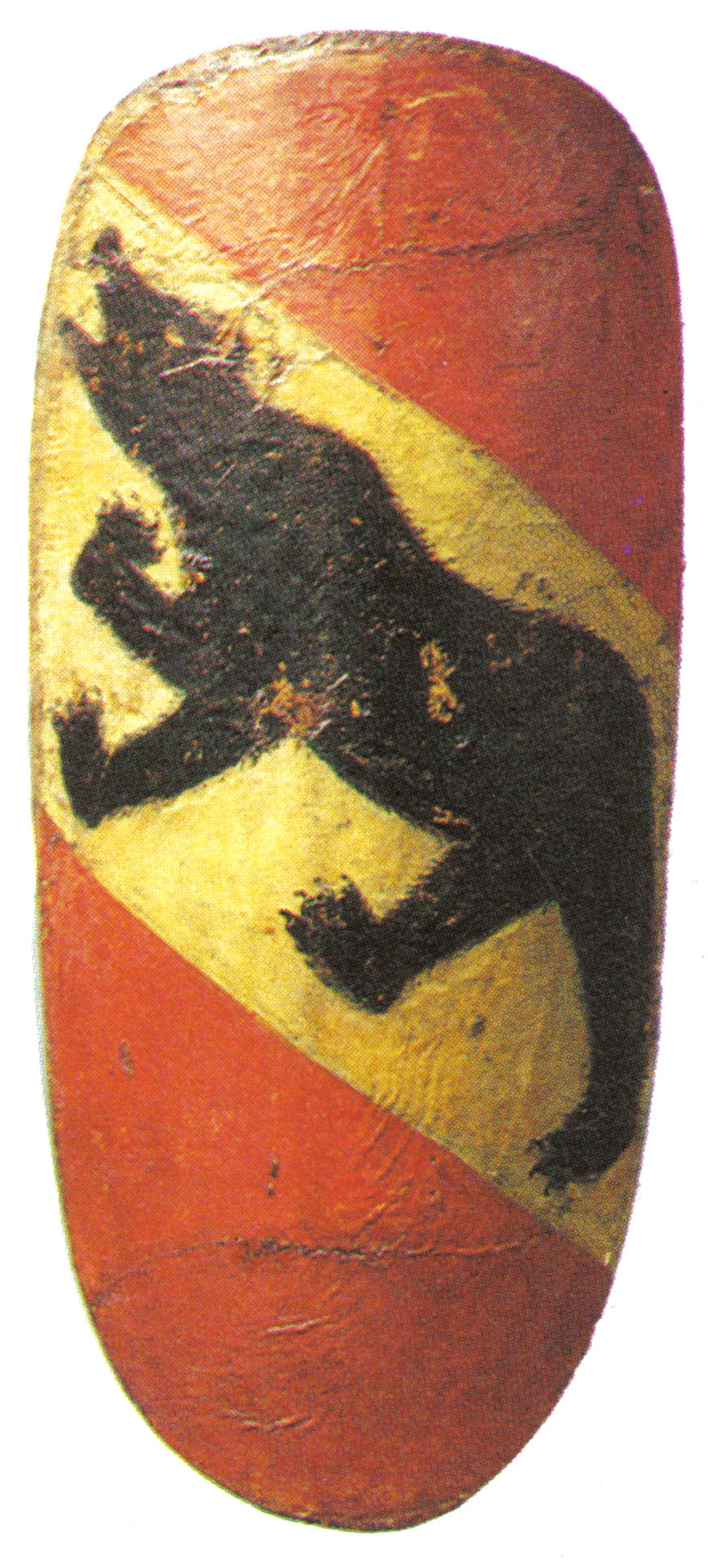
14th-century shield with the arms of Bern

The bear as heraldic charge is not as widely used as the lion, boar or other beasts.

In England it occurs mostly in canting arms, e.g. in the familial coats of arms of Barnard, Baring, Barnes, Bearsley, etc. In British and Irish heraldry, a bear's head is usually muzzled (reflecting the lack of wild bears in those islands), and is more commonly used as a charge than the whole beast. In England and Ireland, the bear's head traditionally includes the neck, while in Scottish heraldry bear heads are cut off close behind the ears.

The bear in the coat of arms of Berlin is also used cantingly, and appears in representations of the Berlin coats of arms in the early modern period (used alongside the Prussian and Brandenburg eagles until the early 20th century). Also canting, but associated with a legendary false etymology of the city's name, is the bear in the coat of arms of Bern.^{[a]}

In 1544 Charles V, Holy Roman Emperor, granted to Madrid the titles of "Imperial" and "Crowned" for this reason, a crown was added on the shield above the tree.

At the Battle of Las Navas de Tolosa in 1212 between Alfonso VIII of Castile and the Almohads, the council of Madrid sent a detachment in support of the Christian king. According to chronicles of the time, these troops carried a flag or banner which identified them: a statant bear on a silver field.

Coat of arms of Appenzell (since 1597 of Appenzell Innerrhoden).

The bear is also used in arms representing Saint Gall, based on a legend of the saint involving a bear. This is the origin of the bear in the coat of arms in the Abbey of Saint Gall and of Appenzell. The bear of Appenzell is represented pizzled; omission of the bear's penis from the coat of arms of Appenzell was seen as a grave insult, and was notoriously forgotten by the printer of a calendar printed in Saint Gallen 1579, which brought Appenzell to the brink of war with Saint Gallen.

Coat of arms of Freising.

The saddled bear of Saint Corbinian's legend is the heraldic symbol of Freising, Bavaria, and the Diocese of Munich and Freising. Pope Benedict XVI, former archbishop of Munich, also applied it in his Papal Arms.

Coat of arms of Greenland since 1989.

In 1666 a polar bear on a blue field was added to the greater/royal arms of the king of Denmark to represent Greenland. It has since then been adopted by Greenland itself as its coat of arms, with the current version having been adopted in 1989. The Greenlandic version bucks European heraldic tradition in favour of Inuit custom by having the bear's left arm raised rather than the right; when used in Denmark the right is raised. It is officially blazoned Azure, a polar bear rampant argent and as such neither version contradicts the other.

== Modern civic and provincial heraldry ==
A demi bear appears in the crest of Lawson in Canada. A grizzly bear, with wings, appears as a supporter in the bearings of Norris, also in Canada. Canada has armigers with polar bears in their bearings. Chimerical half-bear, half-ravens appear as supporters of the Canadian Heraldic Authority.

Civic heraldry in Warwickshire abounds in bears. A bear is also used, cantingly, in the arms of the Berwick-upon-Tweed Borough Council.

The coat of arms of German state of Saxony-Anhalt depicts a bear on a red city gate on lower half, which is inherited from the former Free State of Anhalt. This is also adopted by arms of several districts of the state for their histories with Anhalt.

Russian bears (brown bears) and polar bears appear on the coats of arms and flags of numerous Russian federal subjects and cities, including the Republic of Karelia, the Mari El Republic, the city of Veliky Novgorod and Novgorod Oblast, the Yaroslavl Oblast, Khabarovsk Krai, Perm Krai, Zheleznogorsk, Baltasinsky District, the Chukotka Autonomous Okrug, and the Yamalo-Nenets Autonomous Okrug.

The Finnish region of Satakunta and the corresponding historical province feature a crowned sword-wielding bear on their coats of arms. Pori, Satakunta's capital, features a crowned bear's head on its arms.

The coat of arms of Madrid depicts a bear reaching up into a madroño or strawberry tree (Arbutus unedo) to eat some of its fruit.

The coat of arms of Carpathian Ukraine, which features a red bear, is used as the coat of arms of the Ukrainian Zakarpattia Oblast; it was formerly used by Subcarpathian Ruthenia, the oblast's predecessor within Czechoslovakia.

A black bear appears on the coat of arms (and flag) of Przemyśl, Poland.

A black bear with silver claws and a collar appears on the coat of arms of Samogitia, a cultural region of Lithuania, and the coat of arms of Šiauliai, the capital city of Lithuanian Šiauliai County.

The coat of arms of Madrid

The coat of arms of Berlin

The coat of arms of Saxony-Anhalt

The coat of arms of Anhalt-Bitterfeld, Saxony-Anhalt

The coat of arms of Salzland, Saxony-Anhalt

Coat of arms of Brigachtal, Baden-Württemberg

Coat of arms of Singen, Baden-Württemberg

Coat of arms of Andeer, Switzerland

Coat of arms of Auswil, Switzerland

Coat of arms of Bäretswil, Switzerland

Coat of arms of Biella, Italy

Coat of arms of Bühler, Switzerland

Coat of arms of St Gallen, Switzerland

Coat of arms of Herisau, Switzerland

Coat of arms of Speicher, Switzerland

Coat of arms of Waldstatt, Switzerland

Coat of arms of Eggerding, Austria

Coat of arms of Ottnang am Hausruck, Austria

Coat of arms of Obertraun, Austria

The coat of arms of the unrecognised Republic of East Karelia (1918–1922)

The coat of arms of the Republic of Karelia

The coat of arms of the Mari El Republic

The coat of arms of Veliky Novgorod

The coat of arms of the Yaroslavl Oblast

The coat of arms of Khabarovsk Krai

The coat of arms of Khabarovsk

The coat of arms of Perm Krai

The coat of arms of the Chukotka Autonomous Okrug

The coat of arms of the Yamalo-Nenets Autonomous Okrug

The coat of arms of Zheleznogorsk, Krasnoyarsk Krai. Town was established for the production of plutonium.

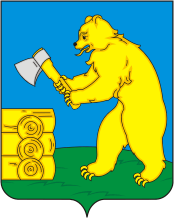
The coat of arms of Baltasinsky district, Tatarstan

The coat of arms of Chernyakhovsk, Kaliningrad Oblast

The coat of arms of Satakunta, Finland

The coat of arms of Pori, Satakunta, Finland

The coat of arms of Zakarpattia Oblast, Ukraine

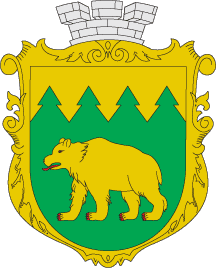
The coat of arms of Skhidnytsia, Ukraine

The coat of arms of Barwice, Poland

The coat of arms of Chełm, Poland

The coat of arms of Ożarów, Poland

The coat of arms of Przemyśl, Poland

The coat of arms of Węgrów, Poland

The coat of arms of Samogitia, Lithuania

The coat of arms of Šiauliai, Lithuania

The coat of arms of Šiauliai District Municipality

The coat of arms of Šiauliai County

The coat of arms of Telšiai County

The coat of arms of Batakiai, Lithuania

The coat of arms of Bartninkai, Lithuania

The coat of arms of Mosėdis, Lithuania

The coat of arms of Pärnu County, Estonia

The coat of arms of Otepää Parish, Estonia

The coat of arms of Valka Municipality, Latvia

== See also ==
- Bear in mythology
- Russian Bear
- Buddy bears

== Notes ==
a.The bear was the heraldic animal of the seal and coat of arms of Bern from the 1220s, attested shortly after its foundation by Berchtold V, Duke of Zähringen in 1191. Swiss chronicles are unanimous in deriving the name of the city from the name of the animal; modern historiography has long assumed, however, that the city had been named for Verona, until the discovery of the Bern zinc tablet in the 1980s, which suggested that the toponymy is of Celtic origin.
