= Coat of arms of Rhineland-Palatinate =

- Armiger: Rhineland-Palatinate State Government
- Shield: In thirds: A red cross on silver; a silver wheel on red; a golden lion on black
- Constituent parts: Arms of the Archbishop and Prince Elector of Trier; the Archbishop and Prince Elector of Mainz, and the Prince Elector of the Palatinate.

The coat of arms of Rhineland-Palatinate was, along with the flag of Rhineland-Palatinate, designed in 1947 after the new Land of Rheinland-Pfalz was formed by the authority of the French High Commissioner to Germany. The flag symbolizes the dedication of Rhineland-Palatinate to Germany (therefore the black-red-gold tricolour) as well as the democratic traditions of Germany. These colours were seen first in this combination during the Hambacher Fest, a mass demonstration by German liberals at the ruins of the Hambacher Schloss in 1832. The Palatinate is therefore connected to these colours.

The constituent arms: Trier, Mainz and Palatinate

The coat of arms, an integral part of the state flag, symbolises the three predominant powers in the region before the French Revolution of the late 18th century:

- the red cross on silver represents the Archbishop and prince-elector (Kurfürst) of Trier
- the silver wheel on red (Wheel of Mainz) represents the Archbishop and prince-elector of Mainz
- the crowned golden lion on black represents the prince-elector of the Palatinate (see: Palatine Lion)

The Volkskrone (people's crown) consists of vine leaves and shows the importance of this crop for local agriculture.

== Legal status ==
§ 1 The state's colors are black-red-gold.

§ 2 The state's coat of arms has the form of a round shield. This is split by an ascending sagging peak and shows on the right side on a silver field a continuous red cross, on the left side red field a silver six spokes wheel and in the ascending black peak a redly crowned and reinforced, gold lion. The coat of arms is covered by a golden people's crown (vine leaves)...

§ 4 Decisive for the design of the state's coat of arms and the state's flag are the patterns, added to this law.

— State legislature, Landesgesetz über die Hoheitszeichen des Landes Rheinland-Pfalz (Wappen- und Flaggengesetz) in der Fassung vom 7. August 1972 (Fundstelle: GVBl 1972, S. 293) Zuletzt geändert durch Gesetz vom 21.7.2003, GVBl. 2003, S. 167.

== See also ==
- Coat of arms of Prussia
- Coat of arms of Germany
- Origin of the coats of arms of German federal states
