= Coat of arms of Bavaria =

Versions
- Lesser coat of arms of Bavaria

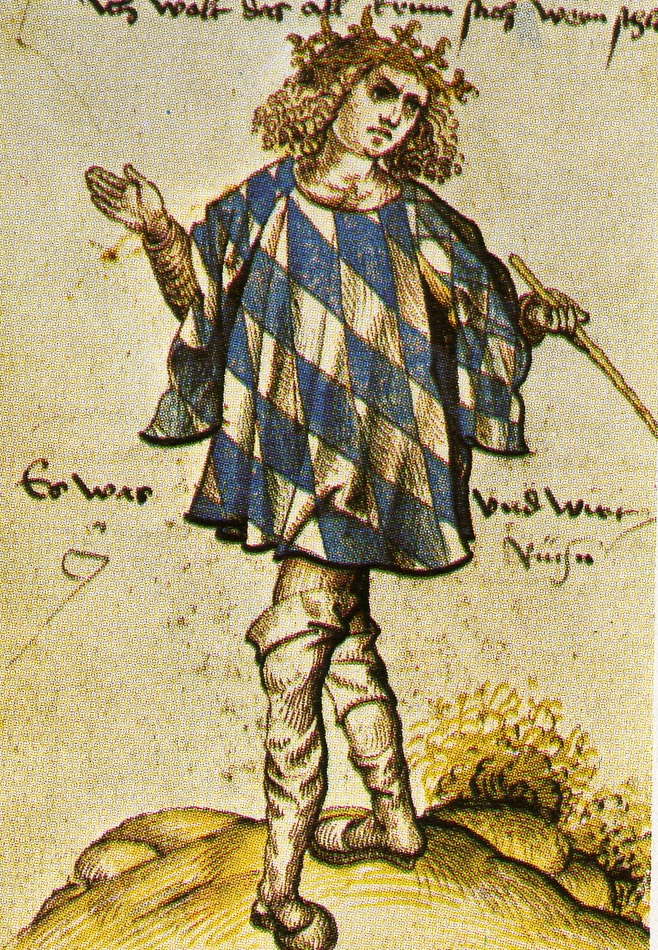
- Herald’s tabard, worn by Jörg Rügen c. 1510
- Armiger: Free State of Bavaria
- Adopted: 5 June 1950
- Shield: Quarterly: (1) sable, a lion rampant Or, armed and langued gules; (2) per fess indented gules and argent; (3) argent, a panther rampant azure, armed Or and langued gules; (4) Or, three lions passant guardant sable, armed and langued gules. An inescutcheon fusilly in bends argent and azure.
- Supporters: Two rampant lions Or langued and armed gules

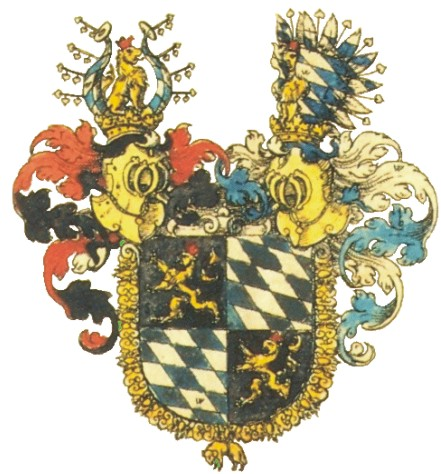
Arms of Wittelsbach (1703)

The coat of arms of Bavaria has greater and lesser versions.

It was introduced by law fully by 5 June 1950:

Article 1 (2) The colours of the state are white and blue.

— State Government, Constitution of the Free State of Bavaria of 2 December 1946; Bavarian Law and Official Gazette 1946, p. 333 ff.

== Meaning ==
The modern coat of arms was designed by Eduard Ege, following heraldic traditions, in 1946.

- First Quarter (The Golden Lion): At the dexter chief, sable, a lion rampant Or, armed and langued gules. This represents the administrative region of Upper Palatinate. It is identical to the coat of arms of the Electorate of the Palatinate.
- Second Quarter (The Franconian Rake): At the sinister chief, per fess dancetty, gules and argent. This represents the administrative regions of Upper, Middle and Lower Franconia. This was the coat of arms of the prince bishops of Würzburg, who were also dukes of Franconia.
- Third Quarter (The Blue Panther): At the dexter base, argent, a panther rampant azure, armed Or. This represents the regions of Lower and Upper Bavaria.
- Fourth Quarter (The Three Lions): At the sinister base, Or, three lions passant guardant sable, armed gules. This represents Swabia.
- The White and Blue Inescutcheon (Herzschild = "Heart Shield"): The escutcheon of white and blue oblique fusils was originally the coat of arms of the counts of Bogen, adopted in 1242 by the House of Wittelsbach. The white and blue fusils are indisputably the emblem of Bavaria and the heart shield today symbolizes Bavaria as a whole. Along with the People's Crown, it forms part of the official minor or lesser coat of arms.
- The People's Crown: The four coat fields with the heart shield in the centre are crowned with a golden band with precious stones decorated with five ornamental leaves. This crown appeared in the coat of arms for the first time in 1923 to symbolize the sovereignty of the people after the dropping out of the royal crown.

== History ==
Bavaria was one of the stem duchies of East Francia and the Holy Roman Empire. The House of Wittelsbach, which ruled in Bavaria for about eight centuries, used the coat lozengy from 1242, later quartering it with the lion of the Electoral Palatinate.

Bavaria became a kingdom in 1806, and in 1835 a new coat of arms was created, similar to today's but representing some regions by different coats of arms. The first known coat of arms of the House of Wittelsbach was azure, a golden fess dancetty. When Louis I married Ludmilla, the widow of Albert III, Count of Bogen, he adopted the coat of arms of the counts of Bogen together with their land. The number of lozenges varied; from the 15th century 21 were used, increasing to 42 when Bavaria became a kingdom in 1806.

Coat of arms of the Electorate of Bavaria (Elector Palatine)
Description Used on the flags of this period, the coat of arms of the joint holding of Duke of Bavaria and Elector Palatine (commonly known as the Elector of Bavaria, as the titles were so closely linked) shows the historical arms of Bavaria and those of the Palatinate, plus an inescutcheon with a golden orb on a red field for his position of Imperial Archsteward of the Holy Roman Empire. Years in use 1623–1806

Coat of arms of the Kingdom of Bavaria (1807–1835)
Description Marquee and regal crown showing the status of Bavaria has been raised to that of Kingdom. The inescutcheon is for the ruling house. Years in use 1807–1835

Coat of arms of the Kingdom of Bavaria (1835–1918)
Description The first quarter shows the golden lion of the Palatinate. The second field shows the Franconian rake. The third field shows a red- and white-striped field with a gold pale, the coat of arms of the margraviate of Burgau, representing Swabia. The fourth field shows a blue lion with a golden crown on white ground (the Lion of Veldenz), representing the ruling branch of the House of Wittelsbach. The inescutcheon represents Bavaria itself. Years in use 1835–1918

== Gallery ==
Until 1623

1623-1777

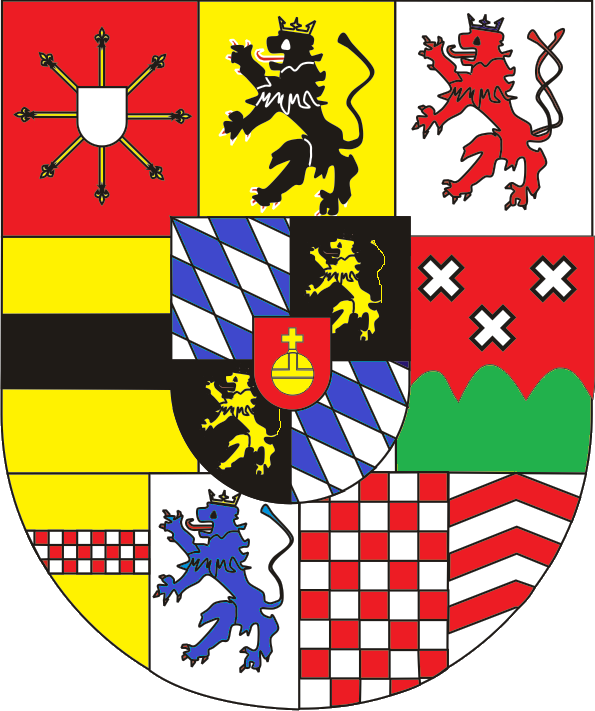
1777-1799

1799-1804

1804-1806

1806

1806-1835

1835-1923

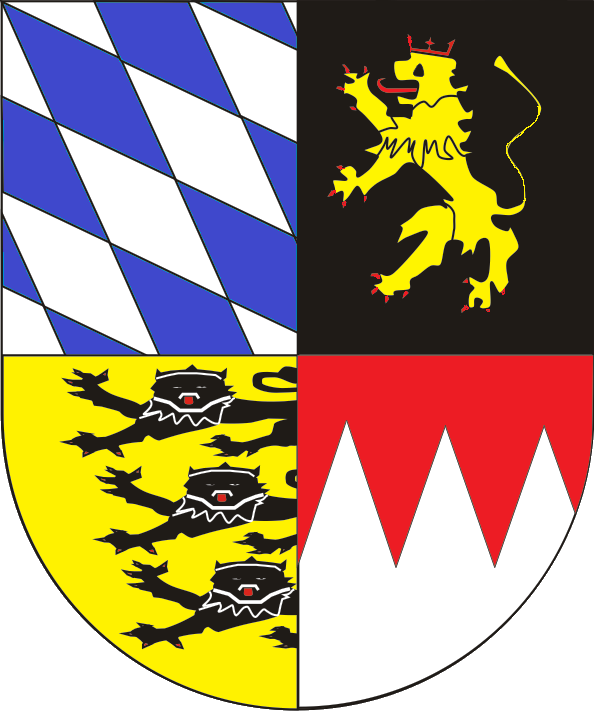
1923-1950

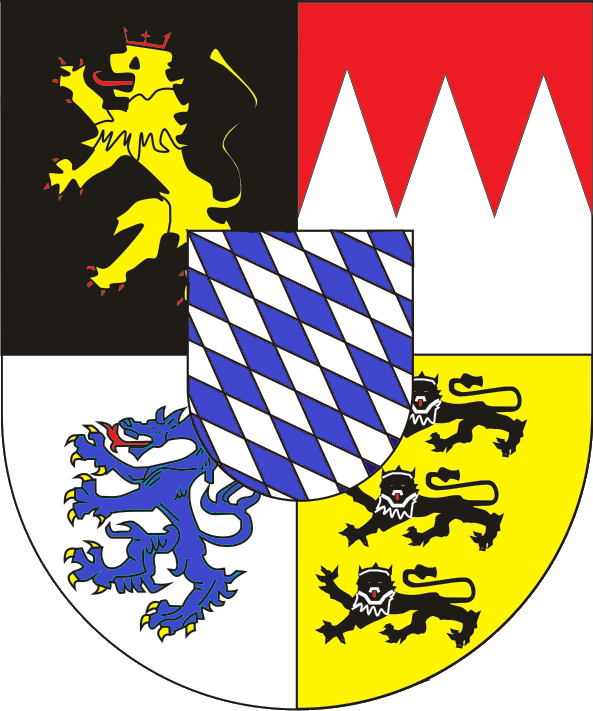
Since 1950

Lit: Wilhelm Volkert; Die Bilder in den Wappen der Wittelsbacher (Wittelsbach und Bayern, Köln, 1980)

== Coat of arms of Kraiburg ==
The arms of Kraiburg

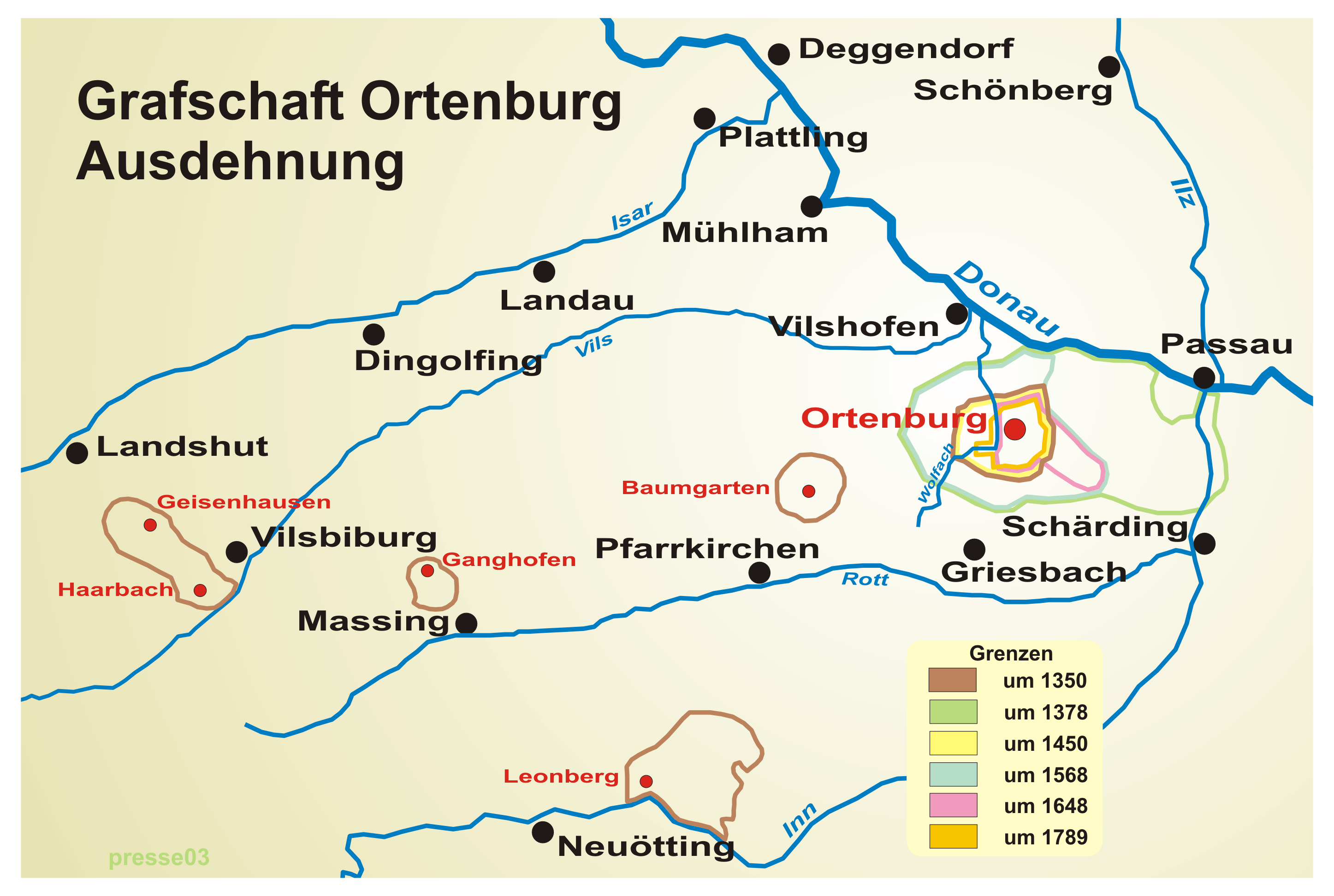
A map showing the area represented

In the eleventh century the counts of Kraiburg, a branch of the counts of Sponheim originating in what is today Rhenish Hesse, acquired land in Upper and Lower Bavaria. In 1259, after the death of the last male member of the family, the county was sold to the dukes of Bavaria. The coat of arms of the family was the "Lion of Sponheim", although the charge was not a lion but a "panthier" (pronounced as in French), a mixture of a dragon and a lion. Nowadays, the fire-spitting panthier or panther is the coat of arms of the city of Ingolstadt. The coat of arms created for the Kingdom of Bavaria in 1835 included the panthier.

== See also ==
- Coat of arms of Prussia
- Coat of arms of Germany
- Origin of the coats of arms of German federal states
