= Charge (heraldry) =

Heraldic motif

In heraldry, a charge is any emblem or device occupying the field of an escutcheon (shield). That may be a geometric design (sometimes called an ordinary) or a symbolic representation of a person, animal, plant, object, building, or other device. In French blazon, the ordinaries are called pièces, and other charges are called meubles ('mobile [things]').

The term charge can also be used as a verb; for example, if an escutcheon depicts three lions, it is said to be charged with three lions; similarly, a crest or even a charge itself may be "charged", such as a pair of eagle wings charged with trefoils (as on the coat of arms of Brandenburg). It is important to distinguish between the ordinaries and divisions of the field, as they typically follow similar patterns, such as a shield divided "per chevron", as distinct from being charged with a chevron.

While thousands of objects found in religion, nature, mythology, or technology have appeared in armory, there are several charges (such as the cross, the eagle, and the lion) that have contributed to the distinctive flavour of heraldic design. Only these and a few other notable charges (crowns, stars, keys, etc.) are discussed in this article.

In addition to being shown in the regular way, charges may be blazoned as umbrated (shadowed), detailed, (Note: As in the coat of arms of the 432d Reconnaissance Group of the United States Air Force.) outlined, shaded in silhouette, futuristic, stylized or simplified.

== Ordinary charges – Ordinaries and sub-ordinaries ==
Unlike mobile charges, the ordinary charges reach to the edge of the field. Some heraldic writers (Note: Woodcock, himself apparently one such author, lists Leigh, Holme, Guillim and Edmondson among these, while other prominent authors such as Fox-Davies shun the distinction as an arbitrary and unuseful practice.) distinguish, albeit arbitrarily, between (honourable) ordinaries and sub-ordinaries. While some authors hold that only nine charges are "honourable" ordinaries, exactly which ones fit into this category is a subject of constant disagreement. The remainder are often termed sub-ordinaries, and narrower or smaller versions of the ordinaries are called diminutives. While the term ordinaries is generally recognised, so much dispute may be found among sources regarding which are "honourable" and which are relegated to the category of "sub-ordinaries" that indeed one of the leading authors in the field, Arthur Charles Fox-Davies (1871–1928), wrote at length on what he calls the "utter absurdity of the necessity for any [such] classification at all", stating that the ordinaries and sub-ordinaries are, in his mind, "no more than first charges". Apparently ceding the point for the moment, Fox-Davies lists the generally agreed-upon "honourable ordinaries" as the bend, fess, pale, pile, chevron, cross, saltire, and chief. Woodcock sheds some light on the matter, stating that earlier writers such as Leigh, Holme and Guillim proposed that "honourable ordinaries" should occupy one-third of the field, while later writers such as Edmondson favoured one-fifth, "on the grounds that a bend, pale, or chevron occupying one-third of the field makes the coat look clumsy and disagreeable". Woodcock goes so far as to enumerate the ordinaries thus: "The first Honourable Ordinary is the cross", the second is the chief, the third is the pale, the fourth is the bend, the fifth is the fess, the sixth is the inescutcheon, the seventh is the chevron, the eighth is the saltire, and the ninth is the bar, while stating that "some writers" prefer the bordure as the ninth ordinary. Volborth, having decidedly less to say on the matter, agrees that the classifications are arbitrary and the subject of disagreement, and lists the "definite" ordinaries as the chief, pale, bend, fess, chevron, cross and saltire. Boutell lists the chief, pale, bend, bend sinister, fess, bar, cross, saltire and chevron as the "honourable ordinaries". Thus, the chief, bend, pale, fess, chevron, cross and saltire appear to be the undisputed ordinaries, while authors disagree over the status of the pile, bar, inescutcheon, bordure and others.

=== Honourable ordinaries ===
Several different figures are recognised as honourable ordinaries, each normally occupying about one-fifth to one-third of the field. As discussed above, much disagreement exists among authors regarding which ordinary charges are "honourable", so only those generally agreed to be "honourable ordinaries" will be discussed here, while the remainder of ordinary charges will be discussed in the following section.

- The chief is the upper portion of the field.
- The bend is a stripe running from the upper left to the lower right, as \, as seen by the viewer. The bend sinister runs from the upper right to the lower left, as /. (In heraldry sinister (Latin: left) refers to the left side of the shield from the perspective of the one wearing it, hence the right side from the viewer's perspective.)
- The pale is a vertical stripe in the centre of the field.
- The fess is a broad horizontal stripe across the centre of the field.
- The chevron is a construction shaped like an inverted letter V.
- The cross is a geometric construction of two perpendicular lines or bands, vertical and horizontal. It has hundreds of variants, most of which are mobile charges rather than ordinaries; some of these will be discussed below.
- The saltire is a diagonal cross, often called Saint Andrew's cross.

Most of the ordinaries have corresponding diminutives, narrower versions, most often mentioned when two or more appear in parallel: bendlets, pallets, bars (multiples of the fess), and chevronels.

Chief

Bend

Pale

Fess

Chevron

Cross

Saltire

=== Honourable ordinaries or sub-ordinaries ===
In addition to those mentioned in the above section, the following are variously called "honourable ordinaries" by different authors, while others of these are often called sub-ordinaries.

- The bordure is a border touching the edge of the field.
- The pile is a wedge issuing from the top of the field and tapering to a point near the bottom. Its length and width vary widely. Piles may occur in any orientation, e.g. pile reversed, pile bendwise and so on.
- The pall or pairle is shaped like the letter Y.
Bordure

Pile

Pile reversed

Pall

=== Sub-ordinaries ===
- The quarter is a rectangle occupying the top left quarter of the field, as seen by the viewer.
- The canton is a square occupying the left third of the chief (sometimes reckoned to be a diminutive of the quarter).
- The orle may be considered an inner bordure: a reasonably wide band away from the edge of the shield, it is always shown following the shape of the shield, without touching the edges.
  - The tressure is a narrower version of the orle, rarely seen except in the double tressure flory and counter-flory, an element of the royal coat of arms of Scotland and of many other Scots coats.
- The base or terrace in base is the lower portion of the field.
- The fret originally consisted of three bendlets interlaced with three bendlets sinister; other depictions form the outer bendlets into a mascle through which the two remaining bendlets are woven. This has also been called a Harington knot, as in the arms of Harington.
- Flaunches, flanches or flasks are regions on the sides of the field, bounded by a pair of circular arcs whose centers are beyond the sides of the shield.
- A label is a horizontal strap, with a number of pendants (usually called points) suspended from it; the default is three, but any number may be specified. The label is nearly always a mark of cadency in British and French heraldry, (Note: Marks of cadency differ from country to country, but are largely the same in Britain and France, and similar in other European countries outside of the German-speaking (and Nordic) countries, where brisures on the shield were less common and different crests were often adopted to indicate the difference. It should also be noted that the English system of cadency, by which the use of the label to indicate the first son is best known, was not developed until the Tudor dynasty.) but is occasionally found as a regular charge in early armory and even in the 20th century. It is sometimes called a file, as in the canting arms of Belfile, a label with a bell hanging from each point. There are some examples in which the strap is omitted, the points issuing from the top of the shield. (Note: See the arms of William de Valence, Earl of Pembroke in Fox-Davies (1909, fig. 120) for an example of this.)
- The gyron is a right triangle occupying the lower half of the first quarter: its edges follow per bend and per fess from the dexter side to the centre of the field. A gyron sinister, much rarer, is a similar figure in the sinister chief. Gyrons are sometimes blazoned to be shown in other positions – as in 'the sun in his splendour .. along with in dexter base a sixth gyron voided'
Quarter

Canton

Orle

Base

Fret

Flaunches

Label

Gyron

== Mobile charges ==
The so-called mobile charges (or sometimes common charges) are not tied to the size and shape of the shield, and so may be placed in any part of the field, although whenever a charge appears alone, it is placed with sufficient position and size to occupy the entire field. Common mobile charges include human figures, human parts, animals, animal parts, legendary creatures (or "monsters"), plants and floral designs, inanimate objects, and other devices. The heraldic animals need not exactly resemble the actual creatures.

=== Geometric charges ===
A number of geometric charges are sometimes listed among the subordinaries (see above), but as their form is not related to the shape of the shield – indeed they may appear independent of the shield (i.e. in crests and badges) – they are more usefully considered here. These include the escutcheon or inescutcheon, lozenge, fusil, mascle, rustre, billet, roundel, fountain, and annulet.

- The escutcheon is a small shield. If borne singly in the centre of the main shield, it is sometimes called an inescutcheon, and is usually employed to combine multiple coats. It is customarily the same shape as the shield it is on, though shields of specific shapes are rarely specified in the blazon.
- The lozenge is a rhombus generally resembling the diamonds of playing cards.
  - The fusil: A more acute lozenge.
  - The mascle: A lozenge voided (i.e. with a lozenge-shaped hole).
  - The rustre: A lozenge pierced (i.e. with a round hole).
- The billet is a rectangle, usually at least twice as tall as it is wide; it may represent a block of wood or a sheet of paper. Billets appear in the shield of the House of Nassau, which was modified to become that of the kingdom of the Netherlands.
- The roundel is a solid circle, frequently of gold (blazoned a bezant).
  - A fountain is depicted as a roundel barry wavy argent and azure.
  - An annulet is a roundel voided (i.e. a ring).
Escutcheon

Lozenge

Fusil

Mascles

Rustre

Billets

Roundels (bezants)

Fountain

Annulets

Several other simple charges occur with comparable frequency. These include the mullet or star, crescent and cross:

- The mullet is a star of (usually five) straight rays, and may have originated as a representation of the rowel or revel of a spur (although "spur revels" do appear under that name). Mullets frequently appear pierced. An unpierced mullet is sometimes called a "star" in Scottish heraldry, and stars also appear in English and continental heraldry under that name (often with six points). The "spur revel" is also found in Scottish heraldry.
  - The estoile: A star with (usually six) wavy rays is called an estoile (the Old French word for 'star'; modern French étoile).
- The comet is shown as a mullet with a bendwise wavy tail, rather than naturalistically.
- The crescent, a symbol of the Moon, normally appears with its horns upward; if its horns are to dexter it represents a waxing moon (increscent), and with horns to sinister it represents a waning moon (decrescent).
Mullet

Mullets pierced

Estoiles

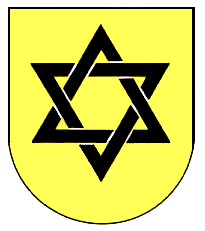
Hexagram

Comet

Star and crescent
- The cross: One of the most frequently found charges in heraldry, if not the most, is the cross, which has developed into, some say, 400 varieties. When the cross does not reach the edges of the field, it becomes a mobile charge. The plain Greek cross (with equal limbs) and Latin cross (with the lower limb extended) are sometimes seen, but more often the tip of each limb is developed into some ornamental shape. The most commonly found crosses in heraldry include the cross botonny, the cross flory, the cross moline, the cross potent, the cross patée or formée, the cross patonce and the cross crosslet.
cross botonny

cross crosslet

cross flory

Maltese cross

cross moline

cross patée

cross patonce

cross potent

In English heraldry the crescent, mullet, martlet, annulet, fleur-de-lis and rose may be added to a shield to distinguish cadet branches of a family from the senior line. It does not follow, however, that a shield containing such a charge necessarily belongs to a cadet branch. All of these charges occur frequently in basic (undifferenced) coats of arms.

=== Human or humanlike figures ===
Humans, deities, angels and demons occur more often as crests and supporters than on the shield. (Though in many heraldic traditions the depiction of deities is considered taboo, exceptions to this also occur.) When humans do appear on the shield, they almost always appear affronté (facing forward), rather than toward the left like beasts. Such as the arms of the Dalziel family of Scotland, which depicted a naked man his arms expanded on a black background. The largest group of human charges consists of saints, often as the patron of a town. Knights, bishops, monks and nuns, kings and queens also occur frequently. There are rare occurrences of a "child" (without further description, this is usually understood to be a very young boy, and young girls are extremely rare in heraldry), both the head and entire body. A famous example is the child swallowed by a dragon (the biscione) in the arms of Visconti dukes of Milan.

Greco-Roman mythological figures typically appear in an allegorical or canting role. Angels very frequently appear, but angelic beings of higher rank, such as cherubim and seraphim, are extremely rare. An archangel appears in the arms of Arkhangelsk. The Devil or a demon is occasionally seen, being defeated by the archangel Saint Michael. Though the taboo is not invariably respected, British heraldry in particular, and to a greater or lesser extent the heraldry of other countries, frowns on depictions of God or Christ, though an exception may be in the not-uncommon Continental depictions of Madonna and Child, including the Black Madonna in the arms of Marija Bistrica, Croatia. (Note: The arms of Marija Bistrica depicting the black Madonna can be found at Heimer (2018).)

Moors—or more frequently their heads, often crowned—appear with some frequency in medieval European heraldry. They are also sometimes called moore, blackmoor or negro. Moors appear in European heraldry from at least as early as the 13th century, and some have been attested as early as the 11th century in Italy, where they have persisted in the local heraldry and vexillology well into modern times in Corsica and Sardinia. Armigers bearing moors or moors' heads may have adopted them for any of several reasons, to include symbolizing military victories in the Crusades, as a pun on the bearer's name in the canting arms of Morese, Negri, Saraceni, etc., or in the case of Frederick II, possibly to demonstrate the reach of his empire. Even the arms of Pope Benedict XVI feature a moor's head, crowned and collared red. Nevertheless, the use of moors (and particularly their heads) as a heraldic symbol has been deprecated in modern North America, (Note: In his July 15, 2005 blog article "Is that a Moor's head?", Mathew N. Schmalz refers to a discussion on the American Heraldry Society's web site where at least one participant described the moor's head as a "potentially explosive image.") where racial stereotypes have been influenced by a history of Trans-Atlantic slave trade and racial segregation, and applicants to the College of Arms of the Society for Creative Anachronism are urged to use them delicately to avoid creating offensive images.

Angel

Angel slaying Demon

Moor

Biscione

Knight

Knight on horse

King

Clergy Member

==== Human parts ====
Parts of human bodies occur more often than the whole, particularly heads (occasionally of exotic nationality), hearts (always stylized), hands, torso and armored limbs. A famous heraldic hand is the Red Hand of Ulster, alluding to an incident in the legendary Milesian invasion. Hands also appear in the coat of arms of Antwerp. Ribs occur in Iberian armory, canting for the Portuguese family da Costa. According to Woodward & Burnett, the Counts Colleoni of Milan bear arms blazoned: "Per pale argent and gules, three hearts reversed counterchanged;" but in less delicate times these were read as canting arms showing three pairs of testicles (coglioni = "testicles" in Italian). (Note: See also Coats of arms of the House of Colleoni at Wikimedia Commons.) The community of Cölbe in Hesse has a coat of arms with a similar charge.

=== Animals ===
Animals, especially lions and eagles, feature prominently as heraldic charges. Some differences may be observed between an animal's natural form and the conventional attitudes (positions) into which heraldic animals are contorted; additionally, various parts of an animal (claws, horns, tongue, etc.) may be differently coloured, each with its own terminology. Most animals are broadly classified, according to their natural form, into beasts, birds, sea creatures and others, and the attitudes that apply to them may be grouped accordingly. Beasts, particularly lions, most often appear in the rampant position; while birds, particularly the eagle, most often appear displayed. While the lion, regarded as the king of beasts, is by far the most frequently occurring beast in heraldry, the eagle, equally regarded as the king of birds, is overwhelmingly the most frequently occurring bird, and the rivalry between these two is often noted to parallel with the political rivalry between the powers they came to represent in medieval Europe. Neubecker notes that "in the heroic poem by Heinrich von Veldeke based on the story of Aeneas, the bearer of the arms of a lion is set against the bearer of the arms of an eagle. If one takes the latter to be the historical and geographical forerunner of the Holy Roman emperor, then the bearer of the lion represents the unruly feudal lords, to whom the emperor had to make more and more concessions, particularly to the powerful duke of Bavaria and Saxony, Henry the Lion of the House of Welf."

The beast most often portrayed in heraldry is the lion. When posed passant guardant (walking and facing the viewer), he is called a léopard in French blazon. Other beasts frequently seen include the wolf, bear, boar, horse, bull or ox, and stag or hart. The tiger (unless blazoned as a Bengal tiger) is a fanciful beast with a wolflike body, a mane and a pointed snout. Dogs of various types, and occasionally of specific breeds, occur more often as crests or supporters than as charges. According to Neubecker, heraldry in the Middle Ages generally distinguished only between pointers, hounds and whippets, when any distinction was made. The unicorn resembles a horse with a single horn, but its hooves are usually cloven like those of a deer. The griffin combines the head (but with ears), chest, wings and forelegs of the eagle with the hindquarters and legs of a lion. The male griffin lacks wings and his body is scattered with spikes.

The bird most frequently found in armory is, by far, the eagle. Eagles in heraldry are predominantly presented with one or two heads, though triple-headed eagles are not unknown, and one eagle appearing in the Codex Manesse has its wing bones fashioned into additional heads. (Note: The town of Waiblingen was granted arms in 1957 displaying a triple-headed eagle said to represent the dukes of Swabia, seen here, and the arms of Reinmar von Zweter, depicted in the Codex Manesse, can be seen here.) Eagles and their wings also feature prominently as crests. Eagles most frequently appear full-bodied, with one head, in numerous positions including displayed, statant, passant and rising. The demi-eagle, which is shown only from the waist up, occurs less frequently. Double-headed eagles almost always appear displayed. As a result of being the dominant charge on the imperial Byzantine, Holy Roman, Austrian and Russian coats of arms, the double eagle gained enduring renown throughout the Western world. Among the present day nations with an eagle charge on their coat of arms are: Albania, Austria, Germany, Montenegro, Poland, Romania, Russia, and Serbia. Additionally, the Double-Headed Eagle of Lagash is used as an emblem by the Scottish Rite of Freemasonry. There are many meanings attached to this symbol, and it was introduced in France in the early 1760s as the emblem of the Knight Kadosh degree.

The martlet, a stylized swift or swallow without feet (sometimes incorrectly, at least in the Anglophone heraldries these days, said to have no beak), is a mark of cadency in English heraldry, but also appears as a simple charge in undifferenced arms. Its attitude is usually statant (and is never blazoned as such); but it can also be found volant. The pelican is notable as frequently occurring in a peculiar attitude described as in her piety (i.e. wings raised, piercing her own breast to feed her chicks in the nest, which is how it is actually often blazoned, 'in its piety' being a fairly modern conceit). This symbol carries a particular religious meaning (as a symbol of Christ sacrificing Himself), and became so popular in heraldry that pelicans rarely exist in heraldry in any other position. Distinction is however observed, between a pelican "vulning herself" (alone, piercing her breast) and "in her piety" (surrounded by and feeding her chicks). The swan is also often seen, and the peacock in heraldry is described as being in its pride. The domestic cock (or rooster) is sometimes called dunghill cock to distinguish it from the game cock which has a cut comb and exaggerated spurs, and the moor cock, which is the farmyard cock with a game bird's tail. Other birds occur less frequently.

The category of sea creatures may be seen to include various fish, a highly stylized "dolphin", and various fanciful creatures, sea monsters, which are shown as half-fish and half-beast, as well as mermaids and the like. The "sea lion" and "sea horse", for example, do not appear as natural sea lions and seahorses, but rather as half-lion half-fish and half-horse half-fish, respectively. Fish of various species often appear in canting arms, e.g.: pike, also called luce, for Pike or Lucy; dolphin (a conventional kind of fish rather than the natural mammal) for the Dauphin de Viennois. The escallop (scallop shell) became popular as a token of pilgrimage to the shrine of Santiago de Compostela. The sea-lion and sea-horse, like the mermaid, combine the foreparts of a mammal with the tail of a fish, and a dorsal fin in place of the mane. (When the natural seahorse is meant, it is blazoned as a hippocampus.) The sea-dog and sea-wolf are quadrupeds but with scales, webbed feet, and often a flat tail resembling that of the beaver.

Reptiles and invertebrates occurring in heraldry include serpents, lizards, salamanders and others, but the most frequently occurring of these are various forms of dragons. The "dragon", thus termed, is a large monstrous reptile with, often, a forked or barbed tongue, membraned wings like a bat's, and four legs. The wyvern and lindworm are dragons with only two legs. The salamander is typically shown as a simple lizard surrounded by flames. Also notably occurring (undoubtedly owing much of its fame to Napoleon, though it also appears in much earlier heraldry) is the bee. (Note: 'Gyronny of eight ermine and gules - in each of the last four gyrons a bee volant en arriere argent' was recorded in the 1670s, well before Napoleon Bonaparte's time.)

Lion rampant

Lion passant

Lion passant guardant

Eagle argent

Swan gorged with a coronet

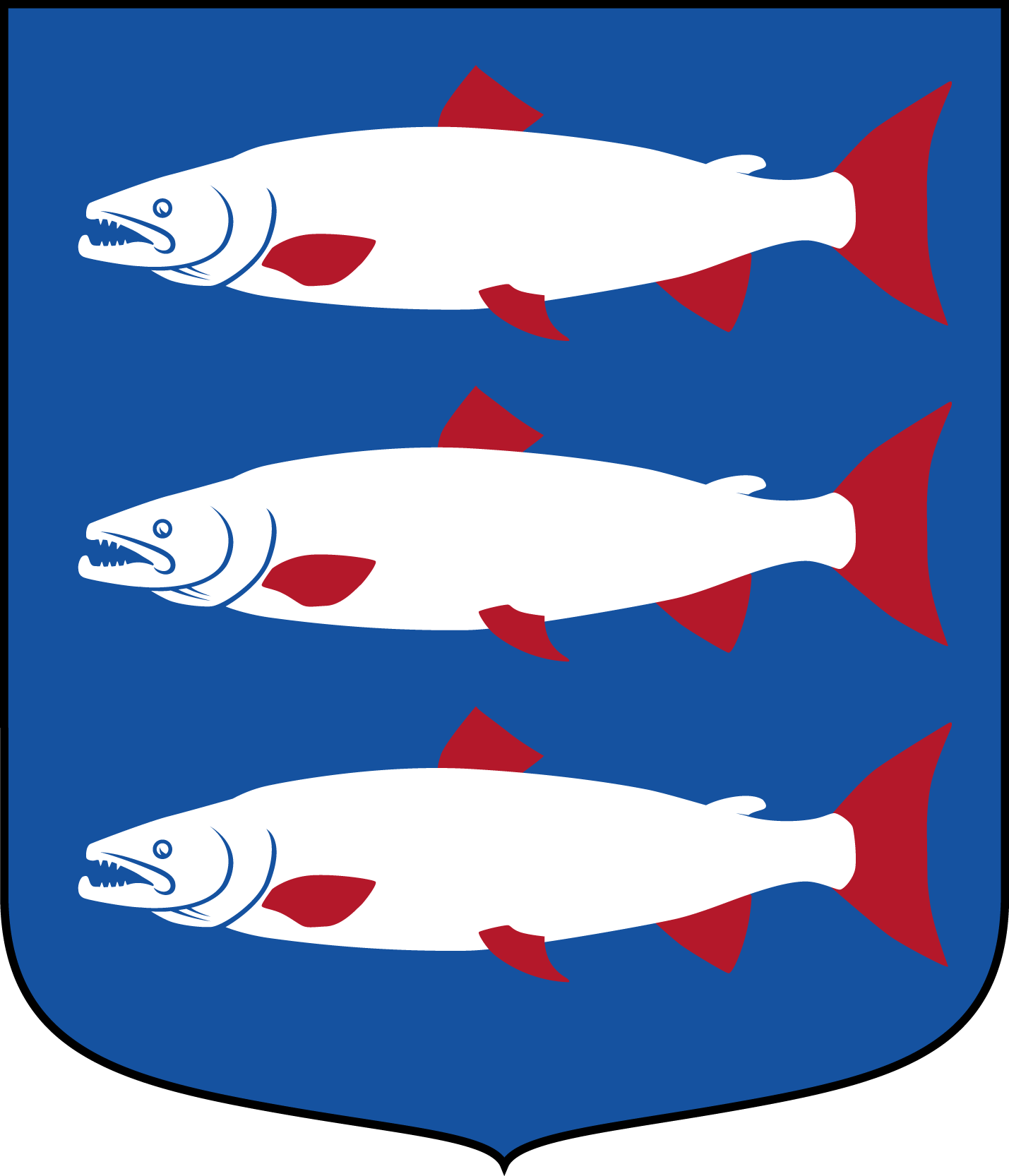
Three salmon naiant

Six martlets

Unicorn

Griffin segreant

Sea lion crowned

Salamander

==== Animal parts ====
Animals' heads are also very frequent charges, as are the paw or leg (gamb) of the lion, the wing (often paired) of the eagle, and the antlers (attire) of the stag. Sometimes only the top half of a beast is shown; for example, the demi-lion is among the most common forms occurring in heraldic crests.

Heads may appear cabossed (also caboshed or caboched): with the head cleanly separated from the neck so that only the face shows; couped: with the neck cleanly separated from the body so that the whole head and neck are present; or erased: with the neck showing a ragged edge as if forcibly torn from the body. While cabossed heads are shown facing forward (affronté), heads that are couped or erased face dexter unless otherwise specified for differencing. Heads of horned beasts are often shown cabossed to display the horns, but instances can be found in any of these circumstances. A lion's head cabossed is called simply a face, and a fox's head cabossed, a mask.

Hart's head cabossed

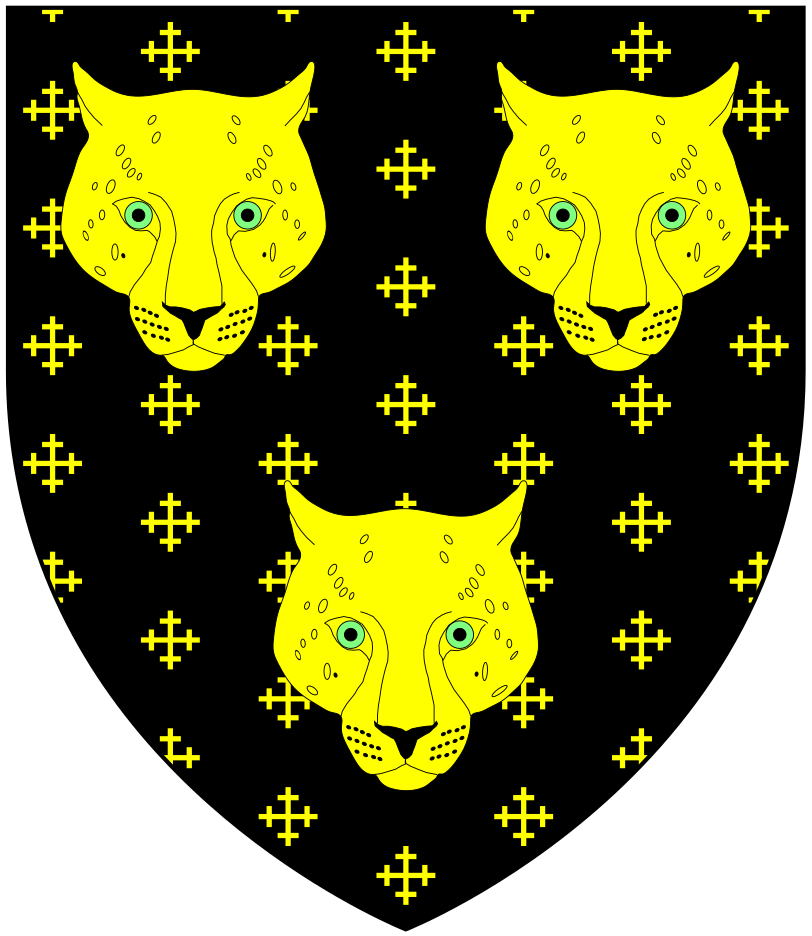
Three leopard's faces

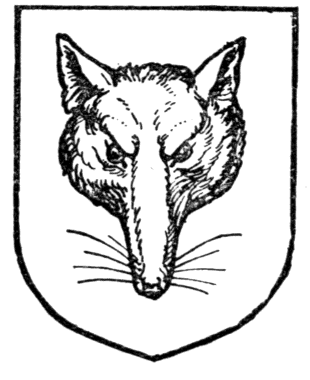
Fox's mask

Boar's head erased

Bull's head couped

==== Attitude of animals ====
The attitude, or position, of the creature's body is usually explicitly stated in English blazon. When such description is omitted, a lion can be assumed to be rampant, a leopard or herbivore passant.

By default, the charge faces dexter (left as seen by the viewer); this would be forward on a shield worn on the left arm. In German armory, animate charges in the dexter half of a composite display are usually turned to face the center.

- An animal toward sinister or contourny is turned toward the right of the shield (as seen by the observer, i.e. the shield-bearer's left), the sinister.
- An animal affronté or full faced faces the viewer.
- An animal guardant faces dexter with its head turned to face the viewer.
- An animal regardant faces dexter with its head turned toward sinister, as if looking over its shoulder.

Certain features of an animal are often of a contrasting tincture. The charge is then said to be armed (claws and horns and tusks), langued (tongue), vilené or pizzled (penis), attired (antlers or very occasionally horns), unguled (hooves), crined (horse's mane or human hair) of a specified tincture.

Many attitudes have developed from the herald's imagination and ever-increasing need for differentiation, but only the principal attitudes found in heraldry need be discussed here. These, in the case of beasts, include the erect positions, the seated positions, and the prone positions. In the case of birds, these include the "displayed" positions, the flying positions, and the resting positions. Additionally, birds are frequently described by the position of their wings. A few other attitudes warrant discussion, including those particular to fish, serpents, griffins and dragons.

The principal attitude of beasts is rampant (i.e. standing on one hind leg with forepaws raised as if to climb or mount - sometimes including an erect member). Beasts also frequently appear walking, passant or, in the case of stags and the occasional unicorn, trippant, and may appear statant (standing), salient or springing (leaping), sejant (seated), couchant or lodged (lying prone with head raised), or occasionally dormant (sleeping). The principal attitude of birds, namely the eagle, is displayed (i.e. facing the viewer with the head turned toward dexter and wings raised and upturned to show the full underside of both wings). Birds also appear rising or rousant (i.e. wings raised and head upturned as if about to take flight), volant (flying), statant (standing, with wings raised), close (at rest with wings folded), and waterfowl may appear naiant (swimming), while cranes may appear vigilant (standing on one leg). Fish often appear naiant (swimming horizontally) or hauriant (upwards) or urinant (downwards), but may also appear addorsed (two fish hauriant, back to back). Serpents may appear glissant (gliding in a wavy form) or nowed (as a figure-eight knot). Griffins and quadrupedal dragons constantly appear segreant (i.e. rampant with wings addorsed and elevated) and, together with lions, may appear combatant (i.e. two of them turned to face each other in the rampant position).

=== Plants ===
Plants are extremely common in heraldry and figure among the earliest charges. The turnip, for instance, makes an early appearance, as does wheat. Trees also appear in heraldry; the most frequent tree by far is the oak (drawn with large leaves and acorns), followed by the pine. Apples and bunches of grapes occur very frequently, other fruits less so. When the fruit is mentioned, as to indicate a different tincture, the tree is said to be fructed of the tincture. If a tree is "eradicated" it is shown as if it has been ripped up from the ground, the roots being exposed. "Erased" is rarely used for a similar treatment. (Note: An example of a tree "erased" can be found here.) In Portuguese heraldry, but rarely in other countries, trees are sometimes found decorticated.

The most famous heraldic flower (particularly in French heraldry) is the fleur-de-lis, which is often stated to be a stylised lily, though despite the name there is considerable debate on this. The "natural" lily, somewhat stylised, also occurs, as (together with the fleur-de-lis) in the arms of Eton College. The rose is perhaps even more widely seen in English heraldry than the fleur-de-lis. Its heraldic form is derived from the "wild" type with only five petals, and it is often barbed (the hull of the bud, its points showing between the petals) and seeded in contrasting tinctures. The thistle frequently appears as a symbol of Scotland.

The trefoil, quatrefoil and cinquefoil are abstract forms resembling flowers or leaves. The trefoil is always shown slipped (i.e. with a stem), unless blazoned otherwise. The cinquefoil is sometimes blazoned fraise (strawberry flower), most notably when canting for Fraser. The trillium flower occurs occasionally in a Canadian context, and the protea flower constantly appears in South Africa, since it is the national flower symbol.

Wheat constantly occurs in the form of "garbs" or sheaves and in fields (e.g. in the arms of the province of Alberta, Canada), though less often as ears, which are shown unwhiskered (though some varieties of wheat are naturally whiskered). Ears of rye are depicted exactly as wheat, except the ears droop down and are often whiskered, e.g. in the arms of the former Ruislip-Northwood Urban District. Barley, cannabis, maize, and oats also occur. The "garb" in the arms of Gustav Vasa (and in the coat of arms of Sweden) is not a wheatsheaf, although it was pictured in that way from the 16th to 19th century; rather, this "vasa" is a bundle but of unknown sort.

Tree fructed and eradicated

Fleur-de-lis

Heraldic rose

Three trefoils

"Vasa"

Cannabis

Three maple leaves

=== Inanimate objects ===
Very few inanimate objects in heraldry carry a special significance distinct from that of the object itself, but among such objects are the escarbuncle, the fasces, and the key. The escarbuncle developed from the radiating iron bands used to strengthen a round shield, eventually becoming a heraldic charge. The fasces (not to be confused with the French term for a bar or fess) is emblematic of the Roman magisterial office and has often been granted to mayors. Keys (taking a form similar to a skeleton key) are emblematic of Saint Peter and, by extension, the papacy, and thus frequently appear in ecclesiastical heraldry. Because St. Peter is the patron saint of fishermen, keys also notably appear in the arms of the Worshipful Company of Fishmongers.

The sun is a disc with twelve or more wavy rays, or alternating wavy and straight rays, often represented "in his splendour" (i.e. with a face). The moon "in her plenitude" (full) sometimes appears, distinguished from a roundel argent by having a face; but crescents occur much more frequently. Estoiles are stars with six wavy rays, while stars (when they occur under that name) have straight rays usually numbering five in British and North American heraldry and six in continental European heraldry. Clouds often occur, though more frequently for people or animals to stand on or issue from than as isolated charges. (Note: Any notion of a mushroom or "atomic cloud" is of relatively recent vintage.) The raindrop as such is unknown, though drops of fluid (goutte) is known. These occasionally appear as a charge, but more frequently constitute a field semé (known as goutté). The snowflake occurs in modern heraldry, sometimes blazoned as a "snow crystal" or "ice crystal".

The oldest geological charge is the mount, typically a green hilltop rising from the lower edge of the field, providing a place for a beast, building or tree to stand. This feature is exceedingly common in Hungarian arms. Natural mountains and boulders are not unknown, though ranges of mountains are differently shown. An example is the arms of Edinburgh, portraying Edinburgh Castle atop Castle Rock. Volcanos are shown, almost without exception, as erupting, and the eruption is generally quite stylised. In the 18th century, landscapes began to appear in armory, often depicting the sites of battles. For example, Admiral Horatio Nelson, 1st Viscount Nelson received a chief of augmentation containing a landscape alluding to the Battle of the Nile.

By far the most frequent building in heraldry is the tower, a tapering cylinder of masonry topped with battlements, usually having a door and a few windows. The canting arms of the Kingdom of Castile are Gules, a tower triple-turreted Or (i.e. three small towers standing atop a larger one). A castle is generally shown as two towers joined by a wall, the doorway often shown secured by a portcullis. The portcullis was used as a canting badge by the House of Tudor ("two-doors") and has since come to represent the British Parliament. The modern chess-rook would be indistinguishable from a tower; the heraldic chess rook, based on the medieval form of the piece, instead of battlements, has two outward-splayed "horns". Civic and ecclesiastical armory sometimes shows a church or a whole town, and cities, towns and Scots burghs often bear a mural crown (a crown in the form of a wall with battlements or turrets) in place of a crown over the shield. Ships of various types often appear; the most frequent being the ancient galley often called, from the Gaelic, a lymphad. Also frequent are anchors and oars.

The maunch is a 12th-century lady's sleeve style. Its use in heraldry arose from the custom of the knights who attended tournaments wearing their ladies sleeves, as "gages d'amour" (tokens of love). This fashion of sleeve would later evolve into Tippet-style stoles. In French blazon this charge is sometimes informally referred to as manche mal taillée (a sleeve badly cut).

Spurs also occur, sometimes "winged", but more frequently occurring is the spur-rowel or spur-revel, which is said to more often termed a "mullet of five points pierced" by English heralds.

Crowns and coronets of various kinds are constantly seen. The ecclesiastical hat and bishop's mitre are nearly ubiquitous in ecclesiastical heraldry. The sword is sometimes a symbol of authority, as in the royal arms of the Netherlands, but may also allude to Saint Paul, as the patron of a town (e.g. London) or dedicatee of a church. Sometimes it is shown with a key, because Saints Peter and Paul are paired together. Other weapons occur more often in modern than in earlier heraldry. The mace also appears as a weapon, the war mace, in addition to its appearance as a symbol of authority, plain mace. The globus cruciger, also variously called an orb, a royal orb, or a mound (from French monde, Latin mundus, the world) is a ball or globe surmounted by a cross, which is part of the regalia of an emperor or king, and is the emblem of sovereign authority and majesty.

Books constantly occur, most frequently in the arms of colleges and universities, though the Gospel and Bible are sometimes distinguished. Books if open may be inscribed with words. Words and phrases are otherwise rare, except in Spanish and Portuguese armory. Letters of the various alphabets are also relatively rare. Arms of merchants in Poland and eastern Germany are often based on house marks, abstract symbols resembling runes, though they are almost never blazoned as runes, but as combinations of other heraldic charges. Musical instruments commonly seen are the harp (as in the coat of arms of Ireland), bell and trumpet. The drum, almost without exception, is of the field drum type. Since musical notation is a comparatively recent invention, it is not found in early heraldry, though it does appear in 20th century heraldry.

Japanese mon are sometimes used as heraldic charges. They are blazoned in traditional heraldic style rather than in the Japanese style.

Anchor

Book with letters

Caduceus

Chess rook

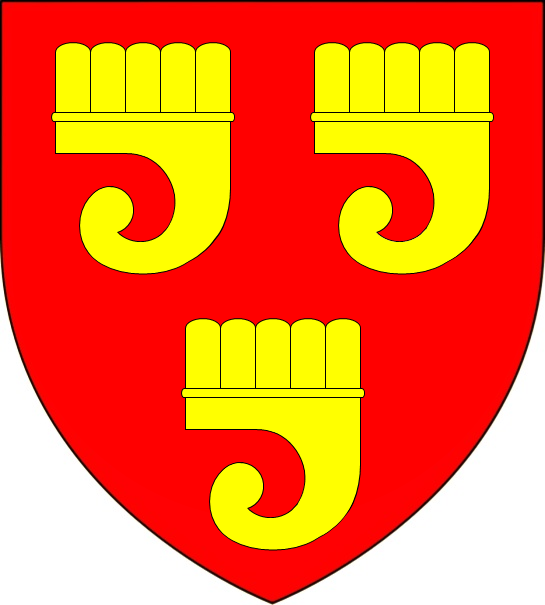
Three clarions

Crown

Escarbuncle

Fasces

Fire basket

Harp

Keys addorsed

Lymphad

Maunch

Moon in her plenitude

Portcullis

Snow crystal

Spur

Sun in his splendour

Sword

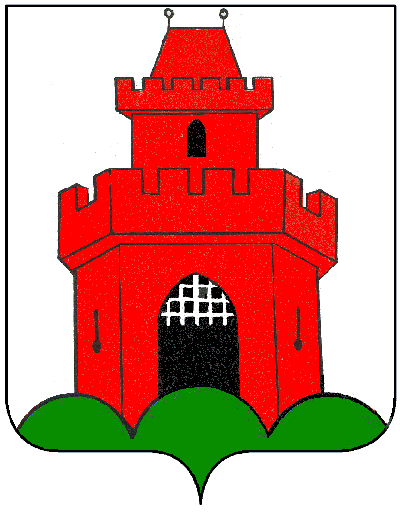
Tower on a mount

Wheel

== See also ==
- Ordinary (heraldry)
- Attitude (heraldry)
- Eagle (heraldry)
- Lion (heraldry)
