= Saxon Steed =

German and Dutch heraldic animal

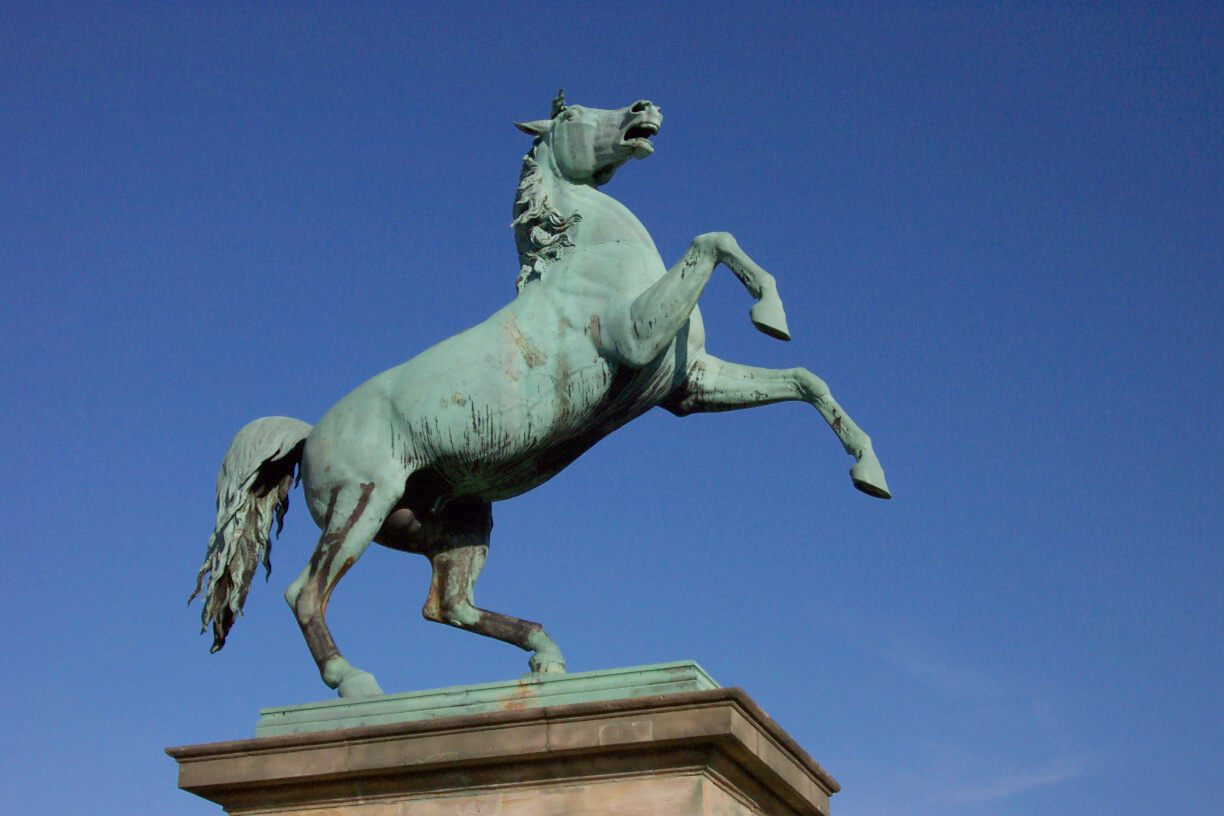
Bronze statue of Saxon Steed in front of Leibniz University Hannover main building

The Saxon Steed (German: Sachsenross, Niedersachsenross, Welfenross, Westfalenpferd; Dutch: Twentse Ros, Saksische ros, Saksische paard; Low German: Witte Peerd) is a heraldic motif associated with the German provinces of Lower Saxony and Westphalia, the Dutch region of Twente, and the English county of Kent.

== Origin and past uses ==
The horse as a heraldic charge associated with Saxony first appears in the late 14th century, at which time it was described as an "old Saxon" motif. For this reason, there has been a long history of antiquarian speculation identifying the motif as a tribal symbol of the ancient Saxons.

A tradition first recorded in 1492 reports that the 8th-century Saxon ruler Widukind displayed a black horse as his field sign.

Historian James Lloyd discusses its connection to the white horse of Kent and suggests that "the Saxon Steed motif was invented in the 14 century …. as a faux ancient symbol for the Saxons", being derived from an account by Gobelinus of the myth of Hengist and Horsa in Britain.

The horse motif was adopted by the House of Welf, whose original symbol was a golden lion on red ground. It has also been used in several provinces in Westphalia (therefore, it is also called Westfalenross meaning 'Westphalian steed', and Welfenross meaning 'Welf steed'). After this, it became the heraldic animal of the Kingdom of Hanover (since 1866 the Prussian Province of Hanover), of the Prussian Province of Westphalia, and of the Free State of Brunswick from 1922 until 1935, when state flags were prohibited by the Nazis and only the flag of Nazi Germany was to be used. This tradition continues in two of the modern federal States of Germany of Lower Saxony and North Rhine-Westphalia.

Flag of the Kingdom of Hanover (1837–1866)

Coat of arms of the Prussian Province of Hanover (1868–1946)

Coat of arms of the Prussian Province of Westphalia (1815–1946)

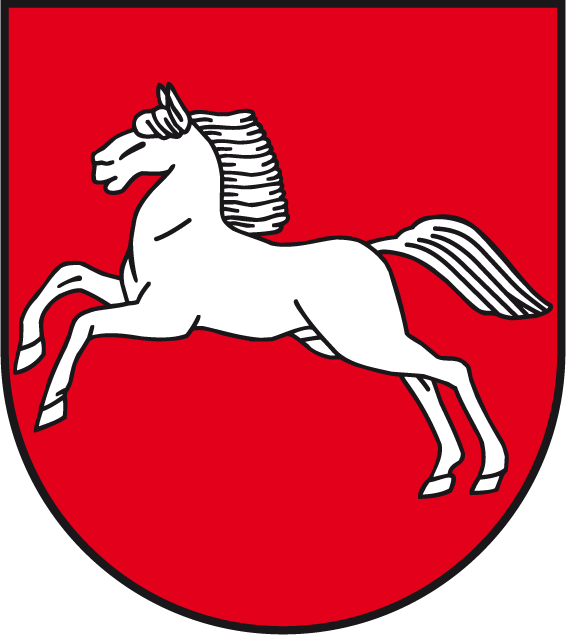
Coat of arms of the Free State of Brunswick (1922–1946)

Flag of the State of Hanover (1946)

== Modern uses ==
=== Coat of arms of Lower Saxony ===
Coat of arms of Lower Saxony

After World War II, on 23 August 1946, the Province of Hanover became an independent state and again used the steed as its coat of arms. Brunswick, which was also an independent state, had made the same decision some weeks before, on 8 July 1946. When these two states, along with Oldenburg and Schaumburg-Lippe, were merged into the new state of Lower Saxony, the Saxon Steed became the coat of arms of the new state, at first unofficial and then official.

=== Coat of arms of North Rhine-Westphalia ===
Coat of arms of North Rhine-Westphalia.

The Saxon Steed is also shown in one of the three sections of the coat of arms of North Rhine-Westphalia, particularly associated with the area of Westphalia.

== British royal arms ==
Royal banner of arms (Hanoverian)

In 1714 the House of Hanover became united in personal union with the United Kingdom. As a result, the Saxon Steed is found in the British royal arms during the Hanoverian period.

== Official sign of Dutch Twente region ==
Flag of Twente

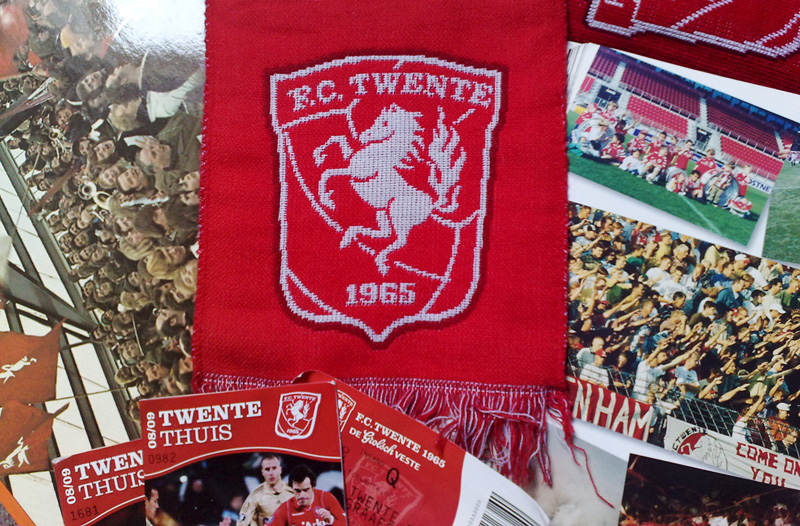
Football club FC Twente's banner and logo

To express the Saxon heritage of the Twente region, local language and culture enthusiast J.J. van Deinse designed a common flag in the 1920s. The region borders on both the German states of Lower Saxony and North-Rhine-Westphalia. The local language, Tweants, is commonly classified as an extension of the Westphalian branch of the Low Saxon language. Within the Netherlands, it is known to be one of the more traditional (or conservative) varieties of the language.

Due to growing interests and pride in local culture, the Saxon Steed has become a popular image. It can be found in varying formats and appearances, as well as to various degrees of stylisation in the likes of local football club FC Twente's logo, the local branch (Twents) of a Dutch public transport provider, and a growing range of other instances.

== United States ==
The King George County, Virginia adopted the shield of 1714 British royal arms, thus the Saxon Steed is found in the seal of King George County.

== See also ==
- Coat of arms of Prussia
- Coat of arms of Germany
- Origin of the coats of arms of German federal states.
