= Coat of arms of Saxony-Anhalt =

Coat of arms of the German state of Saxony-Anhalt

- Armiger: Reiner Haseloff, Minister-President of Saxony-Anhalt
- Adopted: 1991
- Shield: Party per fess, the first barry of ten or and sable, a crown of rue throughout bendways vert, the second argent, a gated wall gules masoned sable, on the top thereof a bear passant of the last, and over all a sinister canton argent charged with an eagle displayed sable armed or langued gules.

The coat of arms of the German state of Saxony-Anhalt represents its historical origins. The land area was formed out of the former Prussian Province of Saxony and the German Free State of Anhalt. The upper part of the coat of arms represents the province of Saxony with its green crancelin while the lower half shows the bear of the Free State of Anhalt.

== History ==
Archbishopric of Magdeburg 1180–1680

Principality (Duchy) of Anhalt-Köthen 1396–1562 and 1603–1853

Duchy of Anhalt 1806–1918

Province of Saxony 1816–1918

Province of Saxony 1919–1944

Free State of Anhalt 1918–1945

Saxony-Anhalt 1945–1952

== See also ==
- Coat of arms of Prussia
- Coat of arms of Germany
- Origin of the coats of arms of German federal states.
