= Armorial of Germany =

This is a list of coats of arms of Germany.

== German Federal States ==
Coat of arms of Baden-Württemberg

Coat of arms of Bavaria

Coat of arms of Berlin

Coat of arms of Brandenburg

Coat of arms of Bremen

Coat of arms of Hamburg

Coat of arms of Hesse

Coat of arms of Lower Saxony

Coat of arms of Mecklenburg-Vorpommern

Coat of arms of North Rhine-Westphalia

Coat of arms of Rhineland-Palatinate

Coat of arms of Saarland

Coat of arms of Saxony

Coat of arms of Saxony-Anhalt

Coat of arms of Schleswig-Holstein

Coat of arms of Thuringia

The origins of the coats of arms of German federal states covers the historical context for the current arms of the German länder.

After the end of the Third Reich, Germany had lost significant parts of its territory and was divided into four occupation zones. Several former states were split between two or more of these zones. The historical state of Prussia, which spread over more than half the territory of Germany, was officially abolished by the Allies; and several new states were formed from its former lands while other parts were annexed by Poland or the USSR.

Some of these states were direct successors of former states, although the former borders changed; others were new constructions. In some cases parts of former states were declared states; in other cases, parts of different states formed a new state. Only the historic city-states of Hamburg and Bremen survived the end of the Third Reich without significant changes of their territory.

The Federal Republic was joined by the Saarland in 1957 and by five states of the former German Democratic Republic in 1990. Each of these states adopted new arms upon joining the federation, by combining the centuries-old coats of the former states (or ruling houses) from whose territories they were formed.

== Overview and historical versions of state arms ==
=== Coat of arms of Baden-Württemberg ===
- Coat of arms of Baden-Württemberg
  - Coat of arms of Hohenstaufen
  - Coat of arms of the Elector Palatine, one shield used in full arms
  - Coat of arms of Wurzburg, one shield used in full arms
  - Coat of arms of Baden, predecessor state of the Weimar Period and before; one shield used in full arms
    - Coat of arms of Württemberg-Baden, predecessor state of the Weimar Period
    - Coat of arms of Württemberg-Hohenzollern, predecessor state of the Weimar Period
      - Coat of arms of the Kingdom of Württemberg, historical state
  - Coat of arms of Hohenzollern, one shield used in full arms
    - Preceding states (Zollern, Hohenzollern-Sigmaringen, Hohenzollern-Hechingen and the Province of Hohenzollern) until Württemberg-Hohenzollern used these arms; rulers chose variations and additions thereupon.
  - Coat of arms of the Electorate of the Palatinate, one shield used in full arms
  - Coat of arms of Austria (lesser), one shield used in full arms

=== Coat of arms of Bavaria ===
- Coat of arms of Bavaria
  - Coat of arms of the Kingdom of Bavaria and preceding Wittelsbach dynasty
  - Coat of arms of Kraiburg
  - Franconian rake, one charge used in full arms
  - Coat of arms of the Elector Palatine, one charge used in full arms

=== Coat of arms of Berlin ===
- Coat of arms of Berlin
  - Historical arms

=== Coat of arms of Brandenburg ===
- Coat of arms of Brandenburg
  - Historical arms, including the Province of Brandenburg

=== Coat of arms of Bremen ===
- Coat of arms of Bremen
  - Historical arms

=== Coat of arms of Hamburg ===
- Coat of arms of Hamburg
  - Historical arms

=== Coat of arms of Hesse ===
- Coat of arms of Hesse
  - Historical arms

=== Coat of arms of Lower Saxony ===
- Coat of arms of Lower Saxony
  - Saxon Steed, principal charge and motif
    - Coat of arms of the Free State of Brunswick (1918–1946), predecessor state
    - Coat of arms of the Duchy of Brunswick (1815–1918) (full and lesser), predecessor state
    - Coat of arms of the Duchy of Brunswick-Lüneburg (1235–1708) predecessor state
    - Coat of arms of the Electorate of Brunswick-Lüneburg (Hanover), predecessor state
    - Coat of arms of the Kingdom of Hanover (1814–1866), predecessor state
    - Coat of arms of the Prussian Province of Hanover (1868–1946), predecessor state
    - Coat of arms of the Free State of Oldenburg (1918–1946), predecessor state
    - Coat of arms of Oldenburg (1180–1918), predecessor state
    - Coat of arms of the Free State of Schaumburg-Lippe (1918–1946), predecessor state
    - Coat of arms of Schaumburg-Lippe (1643–1918), predecessor state
    - Coat of arms of Schaumburg (1110–1640), predecessor state

=== Coat of arms of Mecklenburg-Vorpommern ===
- Coat of arms of Mecklenburg-Vorpommern
  - For history, see Mecklenburg-Schwerin, Mecklenburg-Strelitz and Duchy of Pomerania, predecessor states.

=== Coat of arms of North Rhine-Westphalia ===
- Coat of arms of North Rhine-Westphalia
  - For history, see also Rhine Province, Province of Westphalia and Principality of Lippe, predecessor states.

=== Coat of arms of Rhineland-Palatinate ===
- Coat of arms of Rhineland-Palatinate
  - Wheel of Mainz, principal charge
  - Coat of arms of the Elector Palatine, principal charge
  - Coat of arms of the Archbishop of Mainz (historical)

=== Coat of arms of Saarland ===
- Coat of arms of Saarland
  - Coat of arms of Nassau-Saarbrücken, predecessor state and one of the quarters of the arms
  - Coat of arms of the Duchy of Lorraine, predecessor state, predecessor state and one of the quarters of the arms
  - Coat of arms of the Archbishop of Trier, predecessor state, predecessor state and one of the quarters of the arms
  - Coat of arms of the Elector Palatine, predecessor state, predecessor state and one of the quarters of the arms
    - Coat of arms of the Saar under French protectorate (1947–1956)
    - Coat of arms of the Saar under League of Nations mandate (1920–1935)

=== Coat of arms of Saxony ===
- Coat of arms of Saxony
  - Historical arms

=== Coat of arms of Saxony-Anhalt ===
- Coat of arms of Saxony-Anhalt
  - Historical arms, including the Prussian province of Saxony
  - Coat of arms of Anhalt, predecessor Princedom

=== Coat of arms of Schleswig-Holstein ===
- Coat of arms of Schleswig-Holstein
  - Coat of arms of the Dukes of Holstein-Gottorp, predecessor dukedom

=== Coat of arms of Thuringia ===
- Coat of arms of Thuringia

== Historical coats of arms ==
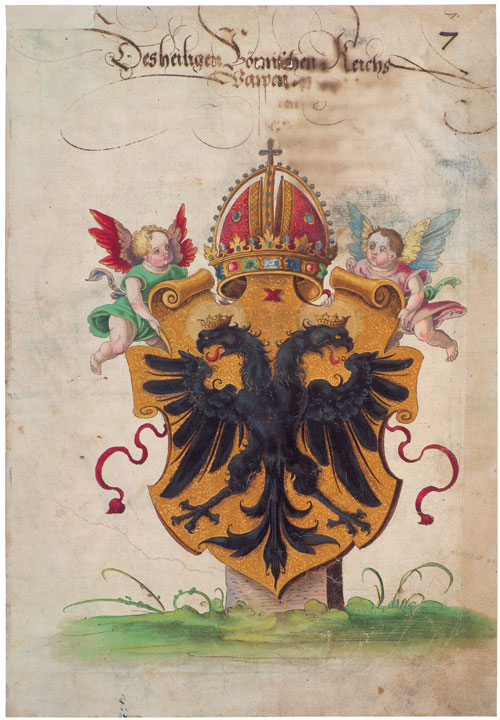
The Arms of the Holy Roman Empire

The Arms of the German Confederation, 1815–1866

Small Arms of the German Empire, 1871–1918

The Greater Arms of the German Empire, 1871–1918

The Lesser Arms of the German Empire, 1871–1918

Arms of the Weimar Republic, 1919–1928

Arms of the Weimar Republic, 1928–1935

National insignia (Hoheitszeichen) of Nazi Germany, 1935–1945

Coat of arms of the German Democratic Republic, 1950–1953

Coat of arms of the German Democratic Republic, 1953–1955

Coat of arms of the German Democratic Republic, 1955–1990

Coat of arms of the Federal Republic of Germany, 1950–present

=== Colonies ===
Coats of arms of German colonies were prepared but never formally granted.

In 1914, the diplomat Wilhelm Solf proposed that Germany's colonies be assigned flags and arms, like the flags and arms used by the British colonies. Solf believed that these would serve to advertise Germany's power, and would encourage German pride amongst the colonials. Kaiser Wilhelm was enthusiastic about the idea, and drafts were prepared for his inspection by Solf in conjunction with the Heraldry Office and the Duke of Mecklenburg. However, World War I broke out before the project was finalised, and the arms were never actually taken into use. This was in part because giving the colonies their own insignia in times of war could have let them have symbols to rally around in rebellion. Following the defeat in the war, Germany lost all its colonies and the prepared arms were therefore never granted.

The arms all followed a similar style. In chief was placed the Imperial Eagle, bearing a shield with the arms of the House of Hohenzollern. In the main part of the shield was a colony specific symbol, such as an elephant for the colony of Kamerun. Above the shield was placed the German State Crown (which was merely symbolic, and did not physically exist). Early drafts included a scroll displaying the name of the colony or protectorate in German, but given the unheraldic nature of such a name scroll, it is unlikely this would have been part of the final blazon.

The proposed arms of the colonies of the German Empire and the current arms of their Successor Polities
German New Guinea (Papua New Guinea)	German Samoa (Samoa)	German South-West Africa (Namibia)
Kamerun (Cameroon; parts of territory voted to join Nigeria)	Togoland (Togo; parts of territory voted to join Ghana)	German East Africa (Tanzania; parts of territory became states of Rwanda and Burundi)

== See also ==
- Germany
