= Coat of arms of Lower Saxony =

- Armiger: Government of Lower Saxony
- Adopted: 1952
- Shield: A white Saxon steed (Sachsenross) on a red background

The coat of arms of Lower Saxony shows a white Saxon Steed (Sachsenross) on a red background. It appears on the flag of Lower Saxony.

== History ==
According to German folklore the banner of Widukind, the last pagan King of the Old Saxons, was a jumping black horse on a yellow field. After the defeat of Saxony and his conversion to Christianity, the banner was changed to a jumping white horse on a red field. This device was adopted by Henry the Lion, the Duke of Saxony (r. 1142–1180). The Archbishop of Cologne also used the device on his seal for his possessions which were in the former lands of the Saxons. In the 17th century, these territories in Westphalia came into the possession of the House Saxe-Lüneburg which continued the use of this device. The Sachsenross is also found in the arms of the Kingdom of Prussia, Kingdom of Hanover and Duchy of Brunswick and today used in the contemporary arms of the federal-state of North Rhine-Westphalia.

The white horse became the coat of arms of the Province of Hanover as a province of the greater Kingdom of Prussia in 1866 after it had been in use for both the Duchy of Brunswick and the Kingdom of Hanover since 1814. It was even in use after the abolition of German monarchy after World War I until 1935. From that year, the use of state flags was prohibited by the Nazi government; only the Flag of Nazi Germany was to be used under this totalitarian system where any form of regionalism was shunned upon and the traditional German states were abolished and replaced with the Nazi Party inspired Gau.

After World War II, the Province of Hanover and the Free State of Brunswick both adopted the white horse as their coat of arms. Subsequently the British occupation regime merged these two states with Oldenburg and Schaumburg-Lippe to create the modern state of Lower Saxony. However, there was no coat of arms because of disagreement over the inclusion of the heraldic arms for Oldenburg and Schaumburg-Lippe. Finally, it was agreed that a simple motif would be the best solution and the Saxonian white horse became the coat of arms for all Lower Saxony. The Arms of Hanover and East Frisia are still used on a regional level.

The white horse is similar to the one used in the coat of arms for the county of Kent in England which is likely to have originated from the Rhineland area.

Flag of Lower Saxony

Duchy of Brunswick-Lüneburg

Principality of Brunswick-Wolfenbüttel

Electorate of Hanover 1708–1714

Kingdom of Hanover 1814–1866

Province of Hanover 1868–1946

Duchy of Brunswick 1815–1918

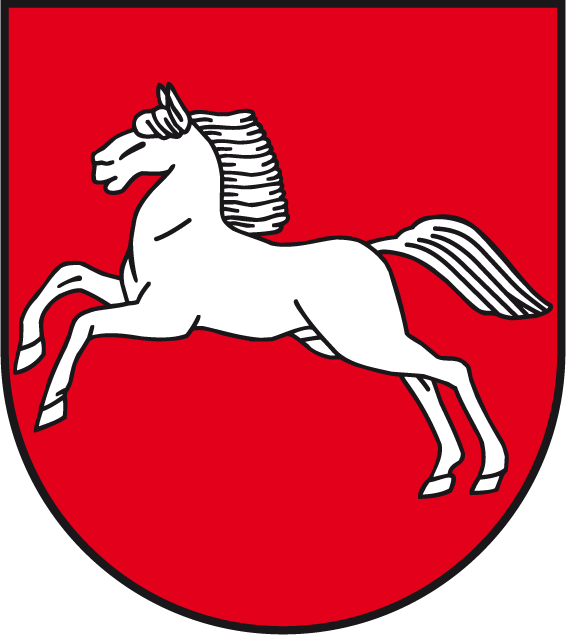
Free State of Brunswick 1918–1946

County of Oldenburg 1091–1774

Duchy of Oldenburg 1774–1810

Grand Duchy of Oldenburg 1815–1918

Free State of Oldenburg 1918–1946

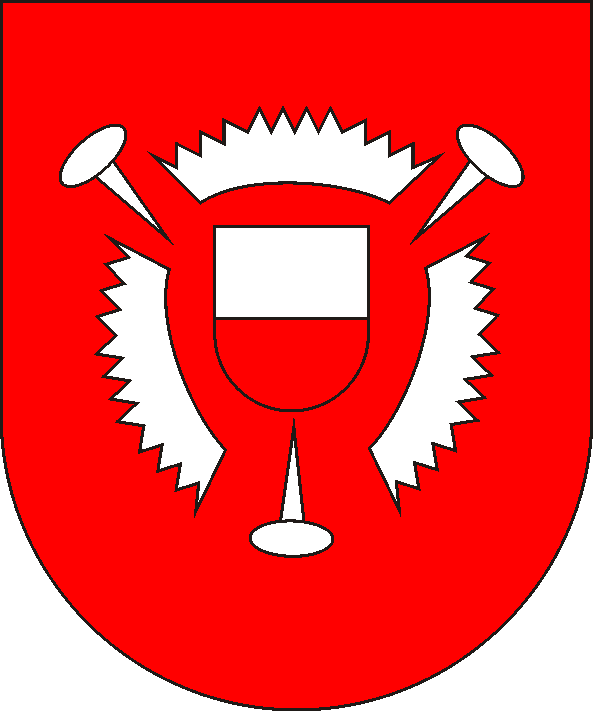
County of Schaumburg

Principality of Schaumburg-Lippe 1647–1918

Free State of Schaumburg-Lippe 1918–1946

== Legal status ==
On 3 April 1951, the government of Lower Saxony made the decision which was written down in the preliminary constitution of the State of Lower Saxony dated on 13 April 1951. The "Act about coats of arms, flags and seals", dated 13 October 1952, stated that the prototype drawn by the German heraldic Gustav Völker should be used in the future.

The new constitution of Lower Saxony from 19 May 1993, adopted this settlement:

Lower Saxony adopts a white horse on a red field as its arms

— „Niedersächsische Verfassung“ vom 19. Mai 1993 [Lower Saxony constitution of 19th May 1993]

A special law of 2007 confirmed this:

The parliament of Lower Saxony has decided the following law:

§1 Symbols of the state

(1) The state uses a half round shield with a jumping white horse (charge) on a red field according to annex 1.
(2) The state uses within the state flag the state colours black-red-gold with the coat of arms of the state according to annex 2.

— Federal Government, Coat of arms law of Lower Saxony (NWappG) of March 8, 2007 (Nds. GVBl. Nr.7/2007 S.117) - VORIS 11410
