= Coat of arms of Brandenburg =

Coat of arms of the German state of Brandenburg

- Armiger: Government of Brandenburg
- Adopted: 1990
- Shield: Argent an eagle Gules armed and beaked Or, langued Gules. The wings charged with a trefoil Or.
- Earlier version: 1816-1946 The Prussian Province of Brandenburg

The German state of Brandenburg has a coat of arms depicting a red eagle.

== History ==
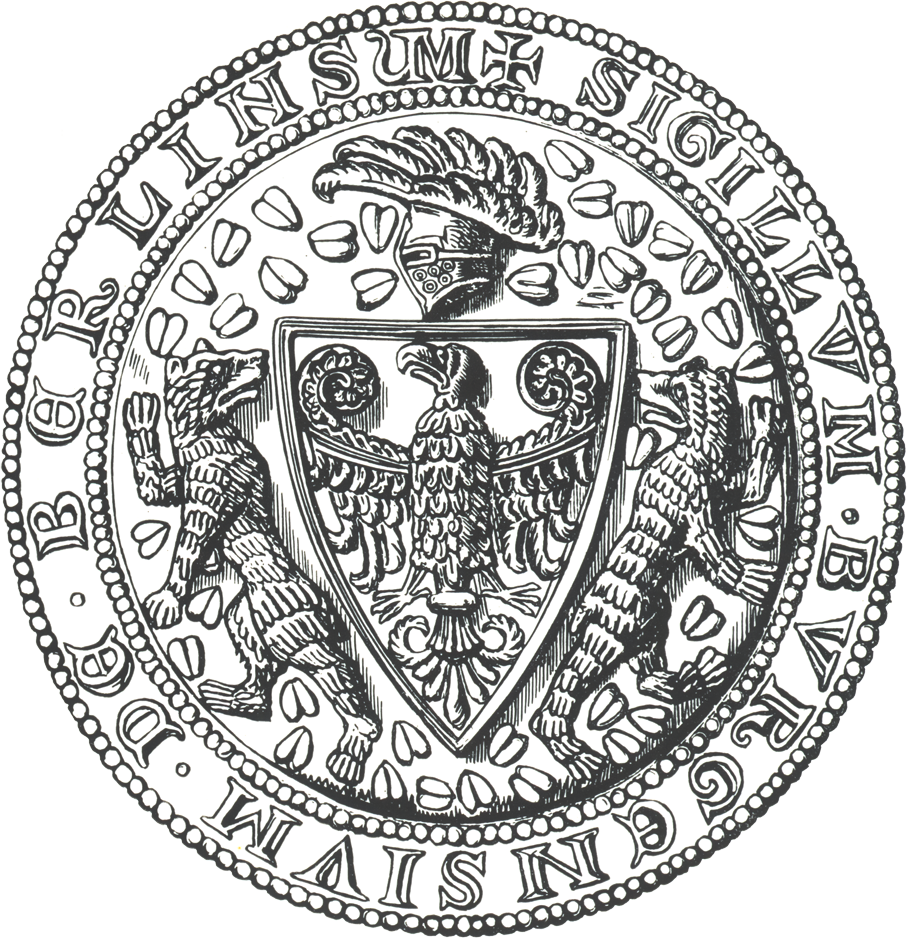
Seal of the city of Berlin (1280), showing the Brandenburg coat of arms flanked by two bears.

According to tradition, the Märkischer Adler ('Marcher eagle'), or red eagle of the March of Brandenburg, was adopted by Margrave Gero in the 10th century. Gustav A. Seyler states that the Ascanian Albert the Bear was the originator. He divided his territory among his children, thereby creating the territories which would later become Anhalt, Brandenburg, and Meissen.

The March of Brandenburg, known as the Holy Roman Empire's 'sandbox' (Streusandbüchse), was granted in 1415 to Burggrave Frederick VI of Nuremberg of the House of Hohenzollern. Over the centuries, the Hohenzollerns made these poor marshes and woodlands the nucleus of a powerful state.

After being formally enfeoffed as Elector Frederick I of Brandenburg, he quartered the arms of Hohenzollern (quarterly sable and argent) and the burgraviate of Nuremberg (Or, a lion sable within a border compony gules and argent) with the Brandenburg red eagle. The blue escutcheon with the golden sceptre, as symbol of the office of archchamberlain (Erzkämmerer) of the Empire, was added under Frederick II (1440-70).

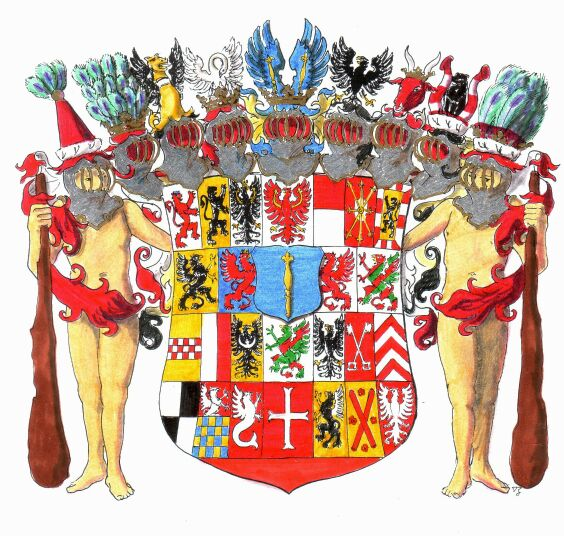
Arms of Brandenburg-Prussia in 1686.

In December 1470, Emperor Frederick III gave the duchies of Pomerania (argent a griffin gules), Kashubia (Or a griffin sable), Stettin (Szczecin) (azure a griffin gules) and Wenden (argent, a griffin bendy-sinister vert and gules) in liege to the electors of Brandenburg, making them in turn the overlords of the dukes of Western Pomerania. The quarters and crests of these duchies and the Principality of Rügen (parted horizontally, a black lion in gold and a wall of bricks in red and blue), however, were incorporated in the Brandenburg arms.

Elector John Sigismund (1572–1619) inherited the Duchy of Prussia, outside the Holy Roman Empire on the Baltic Sea, in 1618. In 1609 John Sigismund's wife had inherited rights to Cleves (Gules an escutcheon argent, overall an escarbuncle Or), Mark (Or, a fess checquy gules and argent), Jülich (Or a lion sable) and Berg (argent a lion gules) in the Rhineland. A compromise over them with the House of Wittelsbach (Palatinate-Neuburg), giving Brandenburg only Cleves and Mark, was reached in the 1614 Treaty of Xanten, but the arms of the other principalities were put in nevertheless.

Arms of the Margraviate of Brandenburg as Arch-Chamberlain of the Holy Roman Empire

The Peace of Westphalia in 1648 brought Brandenburg the former prince-bishoprics of Magdeburg (per pale gules and argent), Halberstadt (per pale argent and gules), Minden (gules, two keys in saltire argent) and Cammin (a silver anchored cross). Rügen and Hither Pomerania, however, had to be given up to Sweden as part of Swedish Pomerania.

Greater Arms of the Prussian Province of Brandenburg.

Middle Arms of the Prussian Province of Brandenburg.

Lesser Arms of the Prussian Province of Brandenburg.

It was around this time too that Elector Frederick William (1620-88), called the "Great Elector", adopted the Pomeranian "wild man" as supporters of his arms. He also placed the outer helmets over the heads of the supporters.

When the Duchy of Prussia gained full sovereignty from Poland in the Treaty of Wehlau on 19 September 1657, the electoral cap, which had until then crowned the smaller versions of the arms on coins, was adorned with arches as in a ducal crown. Elector Frederick III changed the arms substantially when he took the title Frederick I, "King in Prussia", on 18 January 1701.

Coat of arms used between 1945 and 1952

In 1815 after the Napoleonic Wars, the March of Brandenburg was reorganized as the Province of Brandenburg within the Kingdom of Prussia. Its arms depicted the red eagle of Brandenburg flanked by a wildman and a knight.

With the dissolution of Prussia after World War II, new arms were created for Brandenburg in 1945, avoiding any heraldic resemblance with the traditional arms. It showed an oak in front of a rising sun on a background in red, white and red, then also used in the official flag. A shield in blue, white and green was shown in the upper left corner. The little shield is a reversed variant of the flag of the city of Brandenburg upon Havel. This new coat of arms never gained popularity and was thus not considered when Brandenburg regained statehood after 1990. The arms of the state of Brandenburg became a red eagle without adornment.

The current arms are declared thus:

§ 1 State colors

The state colors are red-white.

§ 2 State coat of arms

(1) The coat of arms of the state shows on a shield in white (silver) a red eagle, looking to the right, with wings decorated with stalks of clover in gold and armored gold. (Appendix 1).
(2) The original painting of the coat of arms is preserved at the main public record office of Brandenburg.

— The Prime Minister Dr. Manfred Stolpe, Minister of the Interior Alwin Ziel, Law on the State Symbols of the State of Brandenburg (Hoheitszeichen-Gesetz — HzG) of January 30, 1991 (GVBl.I/91, [Nr. 04], S.26), Potsdam, March, 20th 1991

== See also ==
- Order of the Red Eagle
- Coat of arms of Prussia
- Coat of arms of Germany
- Origin of the coats of arms of German federal states
- Flag of Brandenburg
