= Coat of arms of Prussia =

National symbol of Prussia

The state of Prussia developed from the State of the Teutonic Order. The original flag of the Teutonic Knights had been a black cross on a white flag. Emperor Frederick II in 1229 granted them the right to use the black Eagle of the Holy Roman Empire. This "Prussian Eagle" remained the coats of arms of the successive Prussian states until 1947.

== Late Medieval and Early Modern Prussia ==
Imperial Eagle in the coat of arms of the grand master of the Teutonic Order (13th century)

Coat of arms of Royal Prussia. From 1772 coat of arms of West Prussia

Coat of arms of Duchy of Prussia (1525 –1633) with the letter "S" from Sigismund I the Old

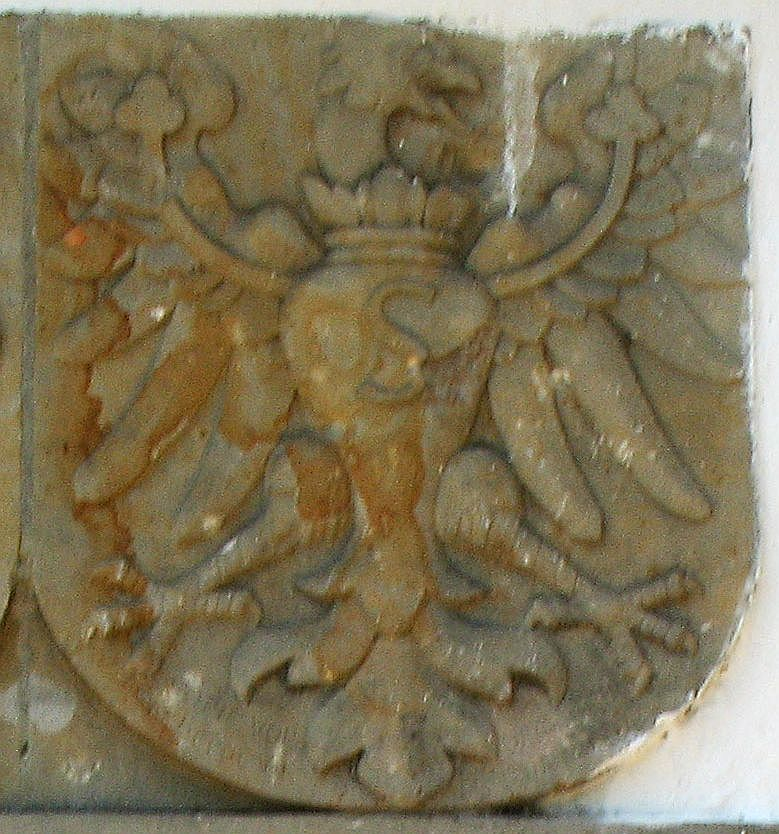
Arms of the Duchy of Prussia (East Prussia) from 1545

== Kingdom of Prussia ==
Lesser Arms of the Prince-Elector of Brandenburg in 1686

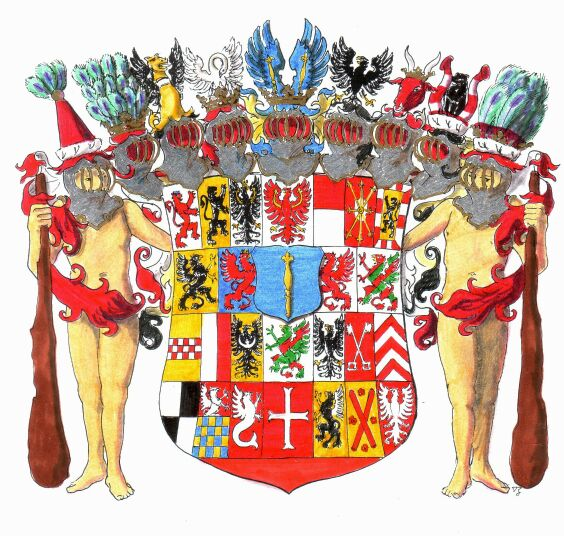
Arms of the Prince-Elector of Brandenburg in 1686

Prussian arms of 1702

Royal arms after a woodcut from 1709

On 27 January 1701, King Frederick I changed his arms as prince-elector of Brandenburg. The older arms of the electors of Brandenburg depicted a red eagle on a white background. Henceforth, the Prussian eagle, now royally crowned and with 'FR' (Fridericus Rex, "King Frederick") on its breast, was placed in an escutcheon on the shield with 25 quarters instead of the electoral scepter. All the helmets made way for one royal crown.

The wild men – figures from Germanic and Celtic mythology representing the 'Lord of the Beasts' or 'Green Man' – that held the arms of Prussia are probably taken from the arms of Pomerania or Denmark. They are also to be found as supporters of the arms of Braunschweig, Königsberg, and the Dutch towns of Anloo, Beilen, Bergen op Zoom, Groede, Havelte, 's-Hertogenbosch, Oosterhesselen, Sleen, Sneek, Vries and Zuidwolde. A wild man and a wild woman have held the shield of the principality of Schwarzburg in Thuringia and the city of Antwerp since the beginning of the 16th century. Two wild men and a wild woman have been included in the seal of Bergen op Zoom since 1365.

A decree from 11 February 1701 placed a crown on the Prussian escutcheon. The king ordained that the whole should be placed on a royal pavilion after the French and Danish examples.

When William III, Prince of Orange and King of England, died on 19 March 1702, the king ordered the arms of the principality placed on his shield. This was to support his claim as heir general, although the Frisian branch of the House of Orange-Nassau claimed it as well.

In 1708 Frederick announced that he would place the quarters of the dukes of Mecklenburg in the Prussian arms to stress his rights to Mecklenburg-Schwerin and Mecklenburg-Strelitz if their ducal lines were to die out. Although Mecklenburg-Strelitz protested, Emperor Joseph I gave permission to Frederick in October 1712. This design was twice officially altered but was not fundamentally changed since.

The electoral scepter had its own shield under the electoral cap. Around the shield, with 36 quarters (including Veere-Vlissingen and Breda), appeared the Order of the Black Eagle with a crowned helmet resting on top. The wild men held banners of Prussia and Brandenburg and behind the pavilion rose a Prussian banner after the example of the French Oriflamme. The motto Gott mit uns ("God with us") appeared on the pedestal.

Already during the reign of Frederick I there is a notable difference between the 'Gothic' representation of the Prussian eagle in the arms and the more naturally depicted and often flying eagle on most coins and military standards.

Coat of arms of the Kingdom of Prussia

Small arms of 1790

"Middle arms" of 1873

Greater arms of Prussia, ca. 1873

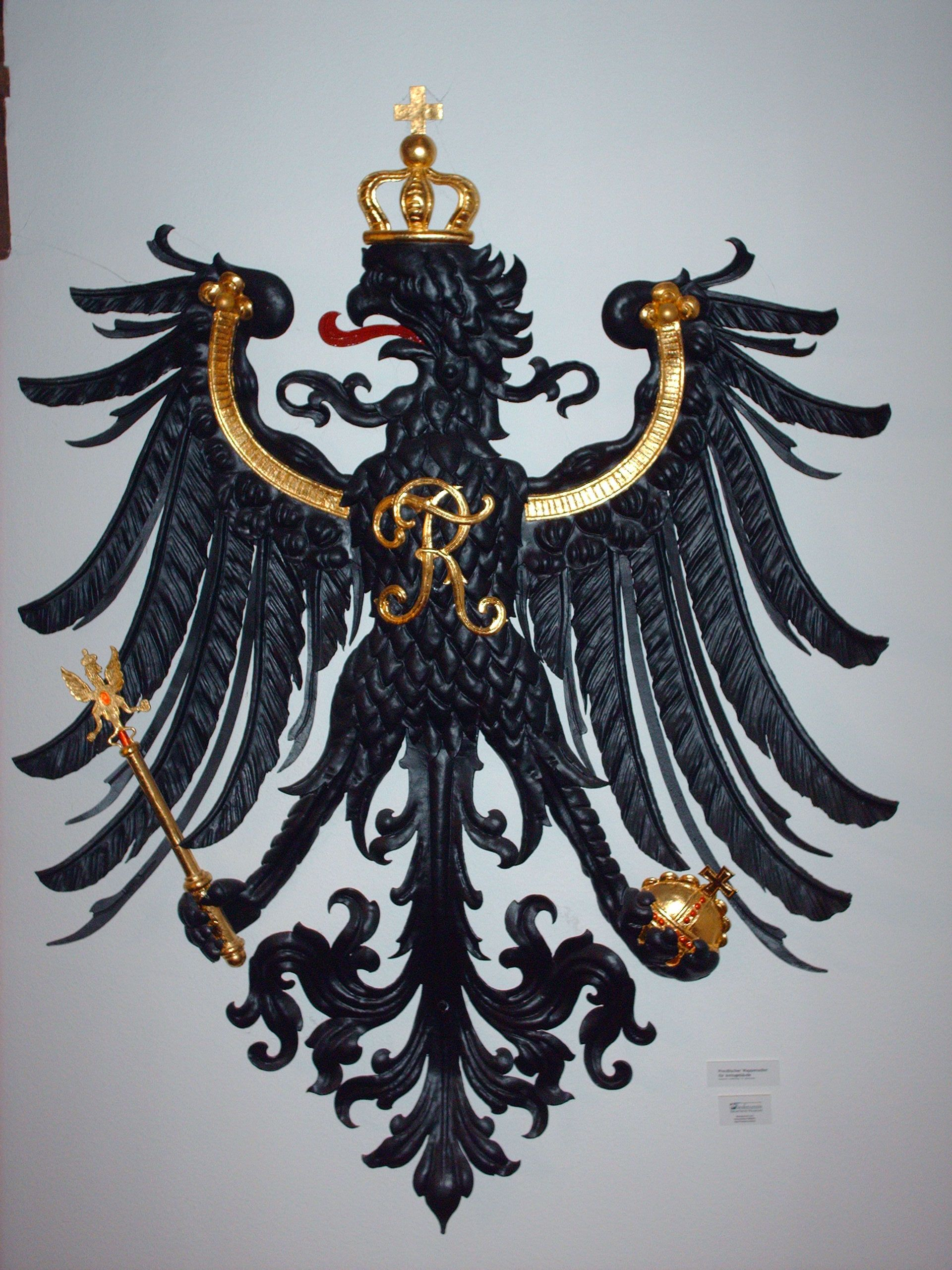
Coat of arms of Prussia 1815

Frederick William I followed his father on the throne on 25 February 1713. According to Ströhl he gave the eagle a scepter and orb. He made an arrangement with the Frisian Nassaus over the title to the Principality of Orange, although it was occupied by France. Besides the arms of Orange, he officially added Veere and Vlissingen on 29 July 1732. The king also added East Frisia to his arms, claiming it in case the prince would die without heir. A fourth escutcheon appeared among the 36 quarters.

Frederick II became king on 31 May 1740. He laid claim to the duchy of Silesia after the death of Emperor Charles VI and declared war on Charles' daughter and heir, Maria Theresa of Austria, thereby starting the Silesian Wars.

Frederick II was followed by his nephew, Frederick William II, on 17 August 1786. Frederick William II inherited the Franconian cadet branches (Ansbach and Bayreuth) of the House of Hohenzollern in 1791. For reasons of economy, however, the official seals were unchanged.

Frederick William III took the throne on 16 November 1797 and changed the arms on 3 July 1804. The reorganisation of Germany by Napoleon I of France made alterations necessary. A new escutcheon was created for Silesia and the shield held 42 quarters. The Order of the Red Eagle of the Franconian line was also added around the shield.

After the fall of Napoleon, Prussia gained extensive territories on the Rhine and in Saxony. New arms were therefore decreed on 9 January 1817. The number of quarters rose to 48, including the horse of Westphalia and Lower Saxony. The number of escutcheons was reduced to four: the black eagle of Prussia, the red eagle of Brandenburg instead of the scepter, the burgraviate of Nuremberg (though ceded to Bavaria), and Hohenzollern proper.

The so-called 'middle arms' were then issued: a shield with the same four escutcheons and ten quarters for Silesia, Rhineland, Posen, Saxony, Pomerania, Magdeburg, Jülich-Cleves-Berg, and Westphalia. This was encircled by the Order of the Black Eagle and held by two wild men with clubs.

The small arms already in use on coins of the 1790s were legitimized as well.

On 7 December 1849, the Swabian lines of Hohenzollern-Sigmaringen and Hohenzollern-Hechingen were annexed by Frederick William IV, who had followed his father on 7 July 1840.

Frederick William IV was followed by his brother William I on 2 January 1861. He changed the arms on 11 January 1864 by combining the escutcheons of Nuremberg and Hohenzollern. After the Second Schleswig War of 1864 and the Austro-Prussian War of 1866, Prussia annexed Schleswig, Holstein, Hanover, Hesse-Kassel (or Hesse-Cassel), and Nassau. King William I of Prussia became William I, German Emperor on 18 January 1871 during the unification of Germany. The Kingdom of Prussia became the predominant state in the newly created German Empire.

William decreed new arms on 16 August 1873. The number of quarters was again 48 with three escutcheons. Added were the collars of the Order of the House of Hohenzollern and the Order of the Prussian Crown. The motto was placed on the dome of the pavilion.

The middle arms of 1873 show more clearly the changes by the additions of Schleswig-Holstein, Hanover, and Hesse-Kassel and the removals of Magdeburg and Cleves-Jülich-Berg.

Coat of arms of the Kingdom of Prussia (1871–1918), in the era of Wilhelm II

The Hohenzollern family uses the motto Nihil Sine Deo (English: Nothing Without God). The family coat of arms, first adopted in 1192, began as a simple shield quarterly sable and argent. A century later, in 1317, Frederick IV, Burgrave of Nuremberg, added the head and shoulders of a hound as a crest. Later quartering reflected heiresses’ marriages into the family.

== Free State of Prussia ==
With the fall of the House of Hohenzollern in 1918, the Kingdom of Prussia was succeeded by the Free State of Prussia within the Weimar Republic. The new Prussian arms depicted a single black eagle, displayed in a more natural than heraldic style. While part of Nazi Germany, the free state's arms depicted a single black eagle, more stylized than before but not in a heraldic manner, with a swastika and the phrase Gott mit uns beginning in 1933. The Reichsstatthaltergesetz of 1935 removed all effective power from the Prussian government.

Arms of the Free State of Prussia while part of the Weimar Republic (1918–33)

Arms of the Free State of Prussia after the 1933 Nazi Machtergreifung

== Dissolution of Prussia ==
In 1947, following World War II, the state of Prussia was dissolved by the Allies, thus rendering its arms defunct.

A black eagle on white is present in the arms of Saxony-Anhalt, to stand for what was Prussian Saxony. The Prussian eagle is also featured in the arms of the Salzlandkreis district of Saxony-Anhalt, as well as the former district of Aschersleben-Staßfurt.

A black eagle on red is present in the arms of Warmian-Masurian Voivodeship in Poland, which corresponds to what was southern East Prussia.

Arms of Saxony-Anhalt of Germany

Arms of Salzlandkreis

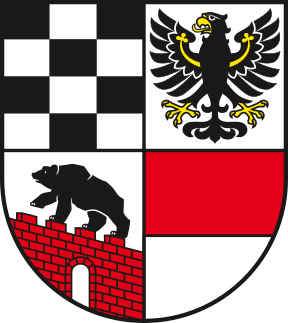
Arms of Aschersleben-Staßfurt, 1995–2007

Arms of the Warmian-Masurian Voivodeship of Poland

== See also ==
- Coat of arms of Germany
- Coat of arms of Austria
- Coat of arms of Brandenburg
- Flag of Prussia
- Iron Cross
- Order of the Black Eagle
- Order of the Red Eagle
