= Pomerania in the Late Middle Ages =

Pomerania during the Late Middle Ages covers the history of Pomerania in the 14th and 15th centuries.

The Duchy of Pomerania gained the Principality of Rugia after two wars with Mecklenburg, the Lands of Schlawe and Stolp (Sławno and Słupsk) and the Lauenburg and Bütow Land (Lębork and Bytów). Pomerelia was integrated into the Monastic state of the Teutonic Knights after the Teutonic takeover of Danzig in 1308, and became the Pomeranian Voivodeship of the Kingdom of Poland in 1454/1466.

The Duchy of Pomerania was internally fragmented into Pomerania-Wolgast, -Stettin, -Barth, and -Stolp. The dukes were in continuous warfare with the Margraviate of Brandenburg due to Uckermark and Neumark border disputes and disputes over formal overlordship of Pomerania. In 1478, the duchy was reunited under the rule of Bogislaw X, when most of the other dukes had died of the plague.

== Hanseatic towns ==
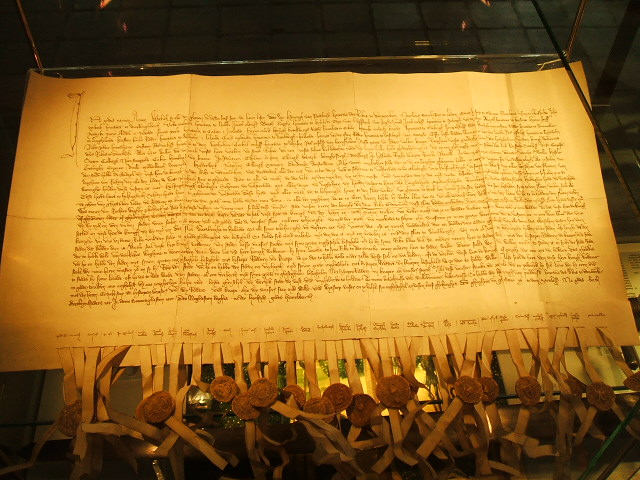
The Treaty of Stralsund (1370) marked the high-water mark of Hanseatic power.

The towns of Pomerania that had joined the Hanseatic League acted independently from the duchy, and sometimes opposed the dukes' interest. The most powerful towns were Stralsund, Greifswald, and Szczecin, but also Demmin, Anklam and Kołobrzeg. Before the Treaty of Stralsund (1370), and during the reign of Eric of Pomerania, the Hanseatic towns were in a state of war with Denmark for hegemony in the Baltic Sea.

Parts of the Pomeranian nobility were engaged in piracy against Hanseatic vessels. Barnim VI of Pomerania-Wolgast did not only engage in piracy himself, he is also known for providing refuge and hideouts for the Likedeeler pirate organisation.

The relation between the towns and the nobility throughout the Middle Ages ranged from alliances and support (German: Landfrieden) to cabalism, banditry and outright warfare.

== Duchy of Pomerania ==
=== Pomerania-Wolgast and -Stettin after the partition of 1295 ===
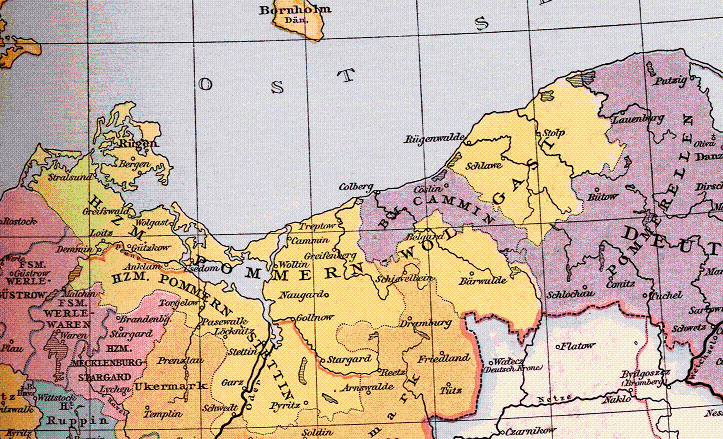
The Duchy of Pomerania (yellow) in 1400, P.-Stettin and P.-Wolgast are indicated; purple: Diocese of Cammin (BM. Cammin) and the Teutonic Order state; orange: Margraviate of Brandenburg; pink: duchies of Mecklenburg

The last duke of Demmin had died in 1264, and the 1236 territorial losses left Demmin at the westernmost edge of the Duchy of Pomerania.

When Barmin I, for a short period sole ruler of the duchy, died in 1278, his oldest son Bogislaw IV took his father's seat. When his half-brothers Otto I and Barnim II reached adulthood in 1294, the brothers ruled in common until Barnim's death in 1295. Bogislaw and Otto now agreed on a partition of the duchy, that would last until 1464: Bogislaw's share was the area where the towns were under Lübeck law, that was Hither Pomerania north of the Peene river (though including Anklam and Demmin on its southern bank) and Farther Pomerania north of the Ina and Stepenitz rivers, both areas were connected by the islands of Usedom (Uznam) and Wolin. Bogislaw made Wolgast his residence, thus the partition became known as Pomerania-Wolgast. Otto's share was the remainder between Peene and Ina centered around Stettin (Szczecin), where the towns were under Magdeburg law. This partition became known as Pomerania-Stettin.

A series of wars was triggered by Denmark in the early 14th century, when Eric VI Menved attempted to reestablish Danish rule in Northern Germany. Pomeranian and Rugian towns and dukes were involved in these wars in various and often opposing coalitions. Since 1314, a coalition consisting mainly of Waldemar of Brandenburg, Stralsund, and the Pomeranian dukes opposed a Danish-led coalition joined by Rugian duke Wizlaw III. This war was ended by the Treaty of Templin in 1317. During this conflict, in 1315, Wartislaw IV of Pomerania-Wolgast, grandson of Rugian Wizlaw II, made an agreement with Eric VI Menved's brother Christopher II of Denmark for inheritance of the Principality of Rügen.

Waldemar of Brandenburg died in 1319. Heinrich, his heir, was still a minor, and died in 1320. The Pomeranian dukes and Cammin bishops tried to take advance of Brandenburg's weakness. They did not only envision territorial gains, but also aimed at changing the status of the duchy from a fief of Brandenburg to a fief directly from the emperor. To achieve these goals, the dukes allied with various neighboring states, mounted military campaigns of which the first Battle of Kremmer Damm in 1332 was the most important, and gave their lands to the Cammin bishops (in 1320) and even to pope John XXII (in 1330). In 1337, the Brandenburg margrave had to take the terrae Lipiany, Świdwin and Falkenberg (all in Neumark) as a fief from the Cammin bishops. In 1338, Barnim III of Pomerania-Stettin was granted his part-duchy as a fief directly from the emperor, while Pomerania-Wolgast remained under formal Brandenburgian overlordship.

The towns Stettin (Szczecin), Greifenhagen (Gryfino), and Gollnow (Goleniów) in Pomerania-Stettin, concerned about a permanent division of the duchy in case Barnim III would not have children, rebelled in 1339 and sided with Pomerania-Wolgast in 1341. Barnim had to move his court to Gartz (Oder). On 12 June 1348 German king and later emperor Charles IV granted the Duchy of Pomerania as a whole and the Rugian principality as a fief to the dukes of both Pomerania-Stettin and Pomerania-Wolgast, erasing Brandenburg's claims. The Pomeranian dukes and towns reconciled in 1344/54.

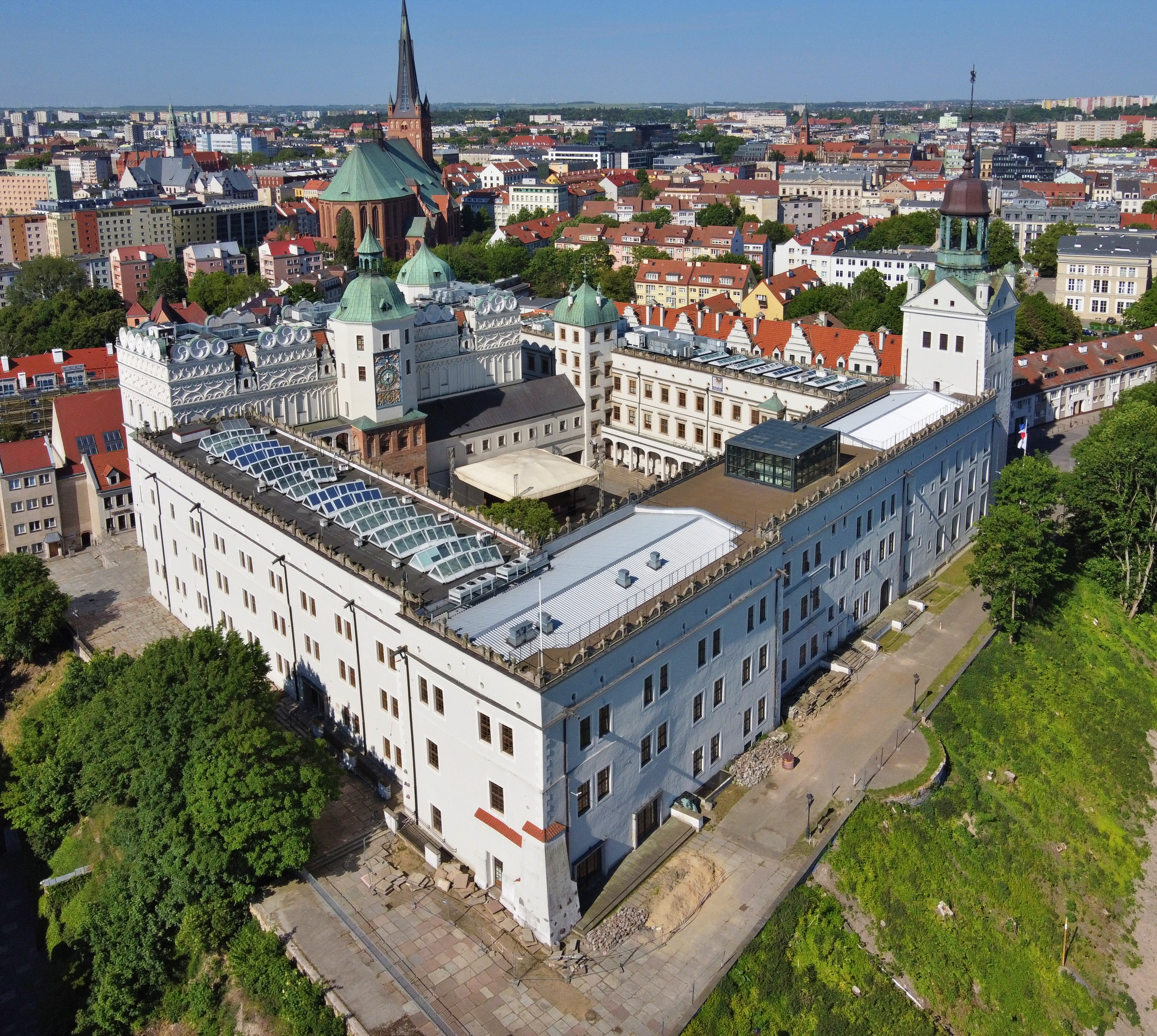
Ducal Castle, Szczecin

Barnim III, against the will of the burghers, erected a castle within Stettin's walls in 1346 (the old burgh had been leveled in 1249), and gained from Brandenburg the eastern parts of the Uckermark, that was in 1354 Pasewalk, in 1355 Schwedt, Angermünde, and Brüssow, and in 1359 (Torgelow).

=== First and Second War for Rugian Succession ===
The Rugian prince Wizlaw III died in 1325. Because of the earlier death of his son, he had no male heir, and Wartislaw IV of Pomerania-Wolgast took over the principality according to the 1315 agreement with Christopher II of Denmark. Yet, in the meantime Christopher's throne had been challenged by Valdemar III of Denmark, and Christopher had granted Rugia to Mecklenburg for her aid against his opponent. After Wartislaw died in 1326, Mecklenburg invaded the principality. Wartislaw's minor sons were aided by primarily by Greifswald and Demmin, but also by Stralsund, Anklam, and Valdemar III, who decisively defeated the Mecklenburgian army in 1228 near Völschow. In the subsequent Treaty of Brudersdorf, Mecklenburg withdrew her claims for 31,000 mark in silver. In exchange, the terrae Tribsees, Grimmen and Barth were pawned to her. When the Pomeranian dukes in 1340 were not able to bail out these lands, but refused to formally hand them over, a second war started. This time, the dukes of Pomerania-Wolgast were aided by those of Pomerania-Stettin and the Counts of Gützkow. After the Pomeranian forces defeated the Mecklenburgians in the Battle of Schopendamm near Loitz in 1351, they were able to take Grimmen and Barth in 1354 and Tribsees in 1356. Mecklenburg dropped her claims thereafter. Another party in these wars for Rugian succession was the bishop of Schwerin, who sought to enforce his claims by legal means, but was not successful in his appeals to various ecclesial courts.

=== After the partition of Pomerania-Wolgast (1368–72) ===
After the death of Barnim IV of Pomerania-Wolgast in 1366, an armed conflict arose when Barnim's brother Bogislaw V refused to share his power with Barnim's sons, Wartislaw VI and Bogislaw VI, and his other brother, Wartislaw V, who in turn allied with Mecklenburg to enforce their claims. On 25 May 1368 a compromise was negotiated in Anklam, which was made a formal treaty on 8 June 1372 in Stargard, and resulted in a partition of Pomerania-Wolgast.

Bogislaw V received most of the Farther Pomeranian parts. Excepted was the land of Neustettin (Szczecinek), which was to be ruled by his brother Wartislaw V, and was integrated into Bogislaw's part-duchy only after his death in 1390. This eastern part duchy became known as Pomerania-Stolp or Duchy of Słupsk. The western remainder of Pomerania-Wolgast was further partitioned between Bogislaw IV and Wartislaw VI on 6 December 1376. Wartislaw VI received Pomerania-(Wolgast)-Barth, the former principality of Rügen, and Bogislaw IV's Pomerania-Wolgast was reduced to an area between Greifswald and the Świna river. When Bogislaw VI died in 1393 and Wartislaw VI in 1394, the latter's sons Barnim VI and Wartislaw VIII ruled in common.

On 6 December 1425 the western part of Pomerania-Wolgast (without Pomerania-Stolp/Słupsk) was partitioned again at a congress in Eldena Abbey, this time among the Wartislaw IX and his brother Barnim VII, who received the eastern part with Wolgast, and their cousins Swantibor II and his brother Barnim VIII, who received the Rugian part with Barth.

In 1456, the University of Greifswald was founded on behalf of Heinrich Rubenow, becoming the first university of Pomerania and one of the oldest in northern Europe.

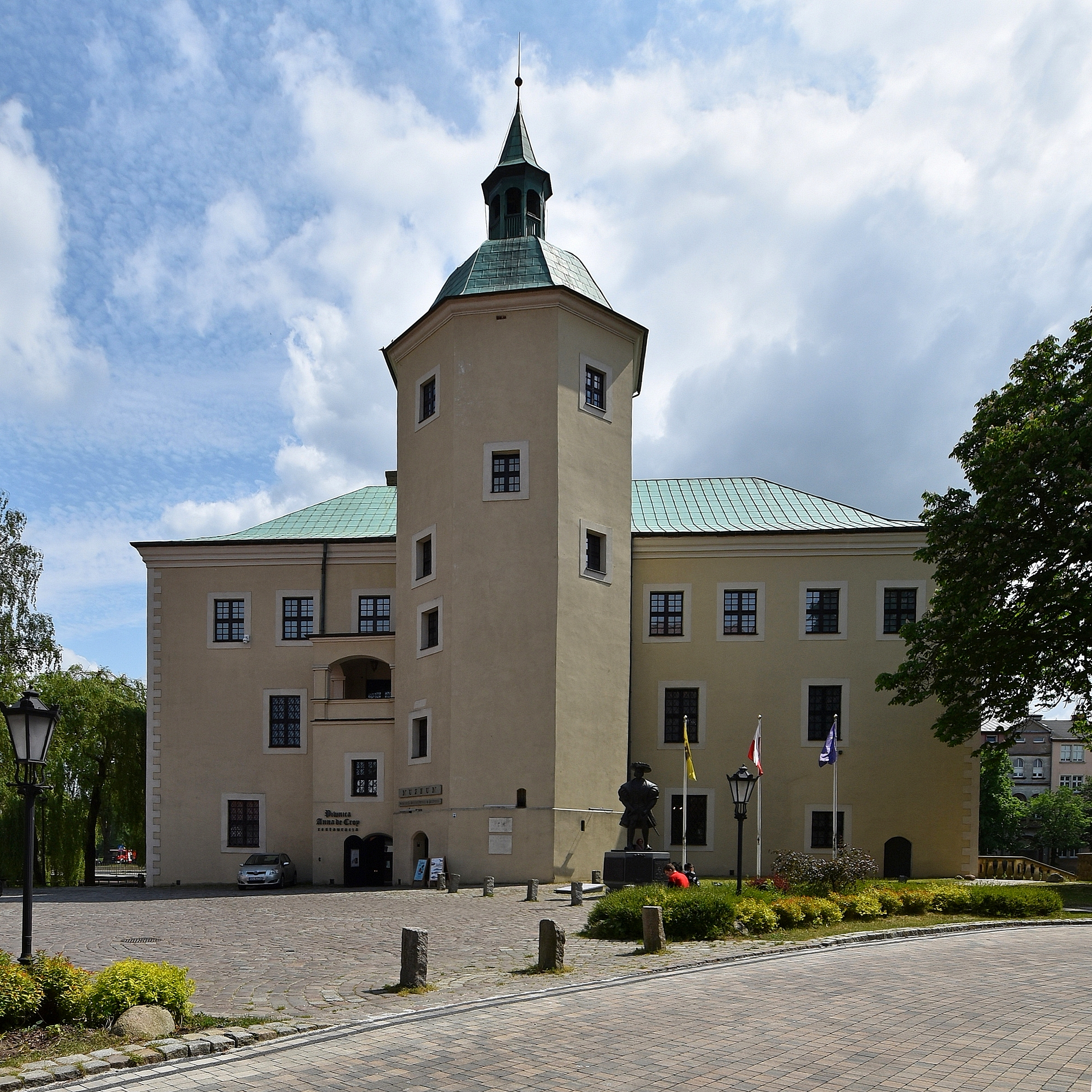
Słupsk Castle

The situation of the descendants of Bogislaw V, who ruled Pomerania-Stolp/Słupsk, differed somewhat from the situation of their western counterparts. The area was more sparsely settled and dominated by powerful noble families, so not much income could be derived by the dukes. On the other hand, the Słupsk branch of the House of Pomerania had relatives among the royal houses of Denmark and Poland. Casimir IV and Elisabeth, the children of Bogislaw V and his first wife Elisabeth, the daughter of Casimir III of Poland, where both raised at the Polish court in Kraków. Elisabeth would become Holy Roman Empress after her marriage with Charles IV, and Casimir was adopted by and designated heir of his grandfather. Yet, his ambitions were thwarted when Louis I of Hungary overruled the testament of Casimir of Poland in 1370, Casimir of Pomerania-Stolp/Słupsk only for a short time took the land of Dobrzyń as a fief. In 1390, it became a vassal duchy of the Kingdom of Poland. Eric II of Pomerania-Stolp/Słupsk, great-grandson of Danish king Valdemar IV in contrast became king of the Kalmar Union in 1397.

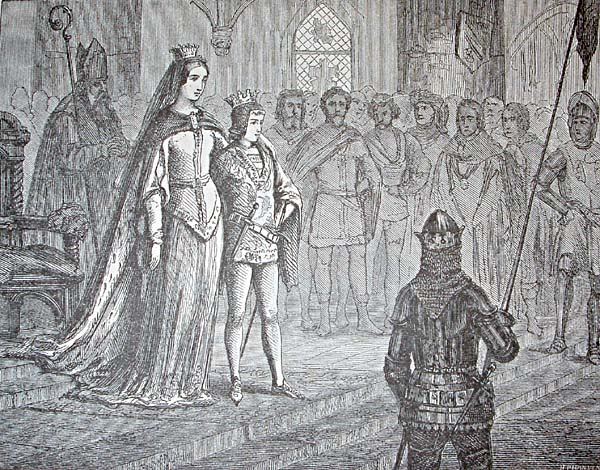
Eric of Pomerania crowned king of the Kalmar Union

Eric however failed in his most ambitious plan, to make his first cousin Bogusław IX of Pomerania-Stolp, king of both the Kalmar Union and the Polish–Lithuanian Commonwealth. Eric had to leave Denmark in 1449 and ruled Pomerania-Rügenwalde, a small partition of Pomerania-Stolp, until his death in 1459.

Pomerania-Stolp was a crucial point in the knights' land supply route. Bogislaw VIII of Pomerania-Stolp allied with both the Teutonic Knights and Poland, but supported the latter after the war had started in 1409 by blocking his lands for the knights' troops and allowing his nobles to kidnap those who were traveling his lands. For his aid, he was granted the Lauenburg (Lębork) and Bütow (Bytów) areas (Lauenburg and Bütow Land) and others, but those were lost in the First Peace of Thorn in 1411.

Casimir V of Pomerania-Stettin at the same time allied with the Teutonic Knights and took part in the Battle of Grunwald, where he was caught by the Poles and bailed out by the knights after the First Peace of Thorn.

The main concern of the Stettin dukes however was the conflict with Brandenburg, primarily in the Neumark and Uckermark regions. Casimir III died in 1372 during a siege of Königsberg (Neumark) (Chojna), after he had managed to receive an imperial approval of his Uckermark possessions in 1370. On 17 May 1373 all dukes of Pomerania concluded an alliance in Karsibór, but situation eased when Otto the Lazy, Margrave of Brandenburg abdicated on 15 August 1373, and the House of Luxembourg took over the march on 2 October that year. In 1374, the Luxembourgians allied with all branches of the House of Pomerania. Pomeranian dukes even held positions in the march's administration.

When Brandenburg changed hands from the House of Luxembourg to the House of Hohenzollern on 11 January 1411, the dukes of Pomerania-Stettin understood their position endangered and reacted with warfare. The first major battle was the second Battle of Kremmer Damm on 24 October 1412. While the dukes of Pomerania-Wolgast had sided with the emperor, disappointment over the emperors disapproval of ridding them of formal Brandenburgian overlordship in 1417 drove them to ally with their Stettin relatives and Mecklenburg. This coalition was backed by Denmark and Poland. A series of battles culminated in a decisive defeat on 26 March 1420 in the streets of Angermünde, and the Uckermark possessions were lost once again.

On 15 September 1423 all Pomeranian dukes (including Eric) allied with the Teutonic Knights against Brandenburg and against the Hanseatic towns. In early 1425, this coalition was joined by Mecklenburg and Poland and successfully invaded Brandenburg. A peace treaty, concluded on 22 May 1427 in Eberswalde, left Pomerania with the Uckermark north of Angermünde. On 16 June 1427 this was confirmed by the Treaty of Templin, which also included a coalition of Pomerania, Brandenburg and Mecklenburg. Yet, in 1440 Pomerania and Brandenburg invaded Mecklenburg, and in 1444 Brandenburg demanded from Pomerania to again hand over the Uckermark to her. When the Pomeranians refused, war broke out again. The first Treaty of Prenzlau in 1448 set the border south of Pasewalk.

=== Polish–Teutonic Wars ===
In 1320 and 1325, Wartislaw IV of Pomerania-Wolgast allied with the Landmeister of the Monastic state of the Teutonic Knights in Prussia against king Casimir III of Poland. When the Treaty of Kalisz had ended the subsequent Polish–Teutonic War (1326–32) in 1343, Wartislaw's sons Bogislaw V, Barnim IV and Wartislaw V changed sides, and Bogislaw V married Casimir III's daughter, Elisabeth. Barnim III of Pomerania-Stettin joined this alliance in 1348. After Poland and Lithuania had formed the Union of Krewo in 1385, and Poland had rejected the claims of Casimir III's grandson Casimir IV of Pomerania-Stolp, Bogislav VIII and Wartislaw VII of Pomerania-Stolp in 1386 concluded an anti-Polish alliance with the Teutonic Knights, after they had settled their common border. In 1388, this alliance was joined by Swantibor I and Bogislaw VII of Pomerania-Stettin as well as Barnim VI and Wartislaw VI of Pomerania-Wolgast.

Later in 1388 however, the dukes of Pomerania-Stolp (Słupsk) left this alliance and sided with Poland, who had promised to partially respect their claims as Casimir III's heirs. Thence, the nobles of Pomerania-Stolp robbed the Teutonic Knights and their supply routes, provoking a counter-attack that destroyed many noble strongholds and the fortifications of Köslin (Koszalin). Bogislav VIII, Barnim V and Wartislaw VII reacted by siding with Polish king Władysław II Jagiełło and concluding mutual trade alleviations.

When Wartislaw VII died, Bogislav VIII and Barnim V concluded a treaty with the Teutonic Knights to safeguard their supply routes in turn for a financial credit. Swantibor I and Bogislav VII of Pomerania-Stettin changed sides in 1395 and allied with the knights in turn for financial aid. Barnim V in 1397 concluded an alliance with Poland, married Vytautas' niece Hedwig and was in Jagiełło's service in 1401 until he died in 1402 or 1404. Bogislav VIII also entered into Jagiełło's service, but changed sides in 1407/08, when he allied with the Teutonic Knights and settled their common border.

Nikolaus Bock, bishop of Cammin (Kamień) from 1398–1410, had also sided with the knights before and placed his bishopric under their suzerainty. Wartislaw VIII of Pomerania-Wolgast allied with the knights in return for an assumption of a debt and additional payments. Swantibor I and Bogislav VII of Pomerania-Stettin joined this alliance in 1409, after they had concluded a ten-year truce with the knights in return for debt cancellation before. When the knights lost the Battle of Grunwald in 1410, Bogislav VIII of Pomerania-Stolp (Słupsk) changed sides again and allied with Poland in return for the Bytów, Człuchów, Debrzno, Biały Bór, Czarne and Świdwin areas, which Poland had regained from the Monastic state of the Teutonic Knights before. This was however cancelled by the First Peace of Thorn in 1411.

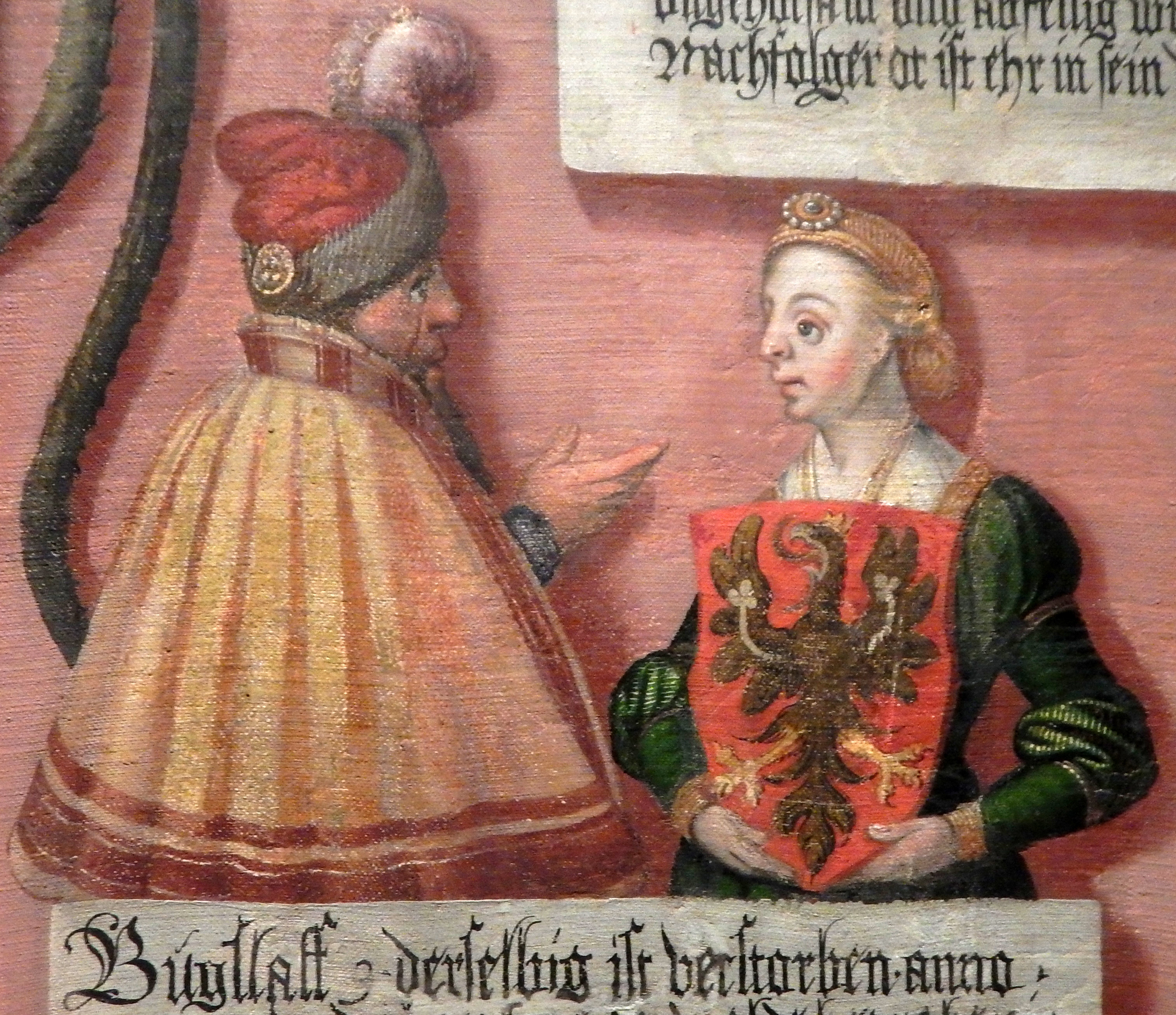
Duke Bogislav IX and his wife Maria of Masovia

While Bogislav VIII nevertheless upheld his alliance with Władysław II Jagiełło, Konrad Bonow of the diocese of Cammin (Kamień) in 1414 concluded an alliance with the Teutonic Knights against both Bogislav VIII and Władysław II Jagiełło, which was turned into a truce soon after. In 1417, Bogislav VIII and the Teutonic Knights settled their common border in the Hammerstein area, ending their conflicts. Bogislav VIII's son Bogislav IX together with all other Pomeranian dukes in 1423 allied with the Teutonic Knights.

==== Gain of Lauenburg and Bütow Land (1455–1467) ====
Eric II of Pomerania-Wolgast and successor of Bogislav IX in Pomerania-Stolp (Słupsk) again allied with Władysław II Jagiełło and his son and successor Casimir IV in his Thirteen Years' War against the Teutonic Knights. On 3 January 1455 he in turn was granted the Lauenburg and Bütow Land at the Pomerelian frontier. When Lębork was retaken by the knights in 1459, the Polish king was upset and ravaged the Słupsk area. Eric reconciled with the king on 21 August 1466, and bought the town from the knights on 11 October, six days before the Second Peace of Thorn, that was signed by Eric in 1467.

=== Bogislav X becomes sole ruler of the duchy of Pomerania (1478) ===
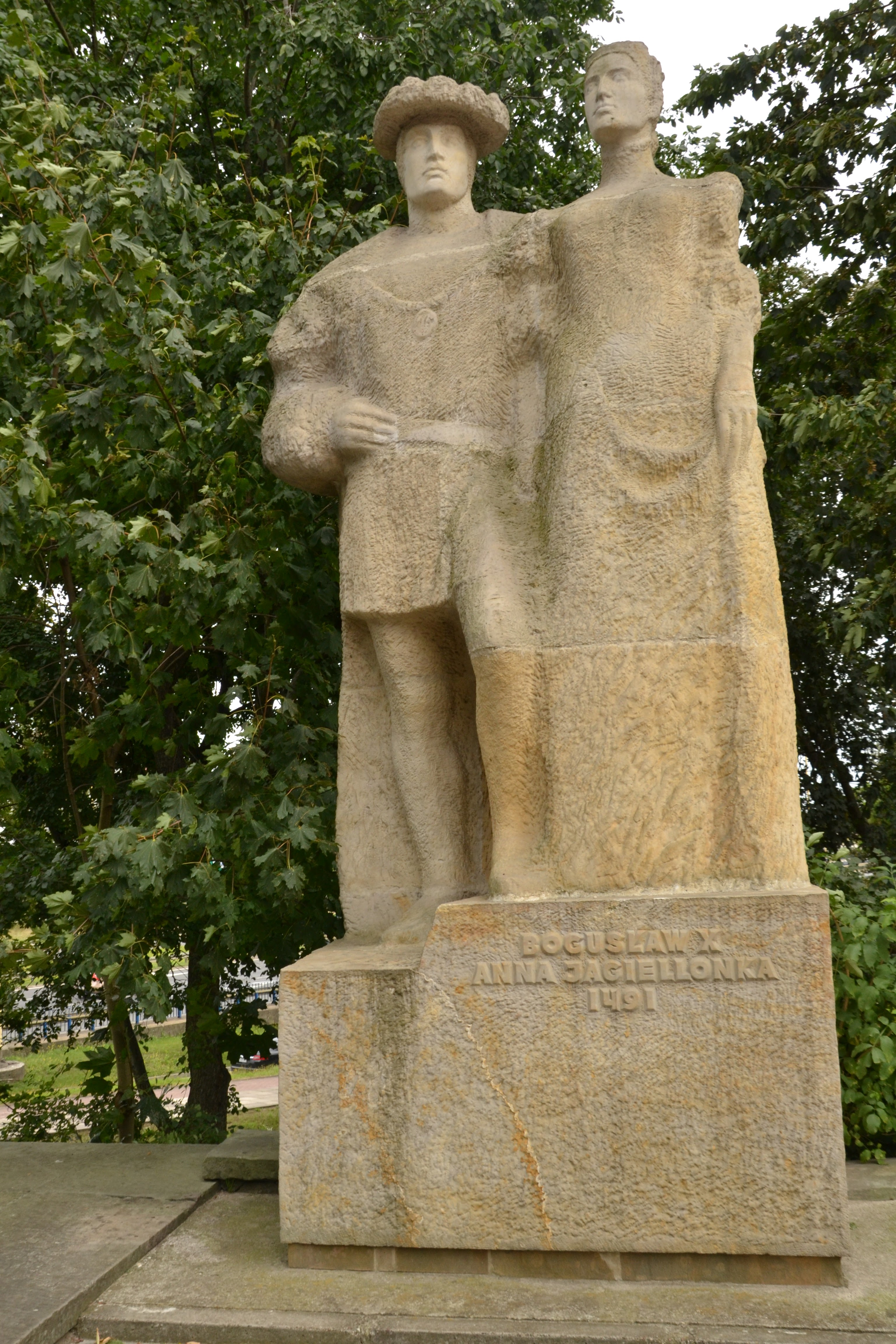
Monument of Duke Bogislaw X and his wife Anna Jagiellon in Szczecin

Pomerania-Wolgast was reunited following the death of both Barnim VII and Barnim VIII in 1451. Both dukes died of the plague. The same disease caused the death of Joachim of Pomerania-Stettin (also in 1451), Ertmar and Swantibor, children of Wartislaw X, and Otto III of Pomerania-Stettin (all in 1464). Thus, the line of Pomerania-Stettin had died out.

The extinction of the House of Pomerania-Stettin triggered a conflict about inheritance with the Margraviate of Brandenburg. In the Treaty of Soldin of 1466, a compromise was negotiated: Wartislaw X and Eric II, the dukes of Pomerania, took over Pomerania-Stettin as a Brandenburgian fief. This was disputed already during the same year by the emperor, who intervened against the Brandenburgian overlordship of Pomerania. This led to a series of further warfare and truces, that were ended by the Treaty of Prenzlau of 1472, basically confirming the ruling of the Soldin treaty, but settling on a border north of Gartz (Oder) resembling Brandenburg's recent gains. This treaty was accepted by the emperor.

In 1474, Eric II died of the plague, and his son Bogislav X inherited Pomerania-Stolp. Bogislav's brothers had died the same year. After the death of his uncle Wartislaw X in 1478, he became the first sole ruler in the Duchy of Pomerania since almost 200 years.

Eric II had left Pomerania in tense conflicts with Brandenburg and Mecklenburg. Bogislav managed to resolve these conflicts by both diplomatic and military means. He married his sister, Sophia, to Magnus II, Duke of Mecklenburg, and his other sister, Magarete, was married to Magnus's brother Balthasar. Bogislav himself married Magarete, daughter of Brandenburg's Prince-elector Frederick II. Also, in 1478, Bogislav regained areas lost to Brandenburg by his father, most notably the town of Gartz and other small towns and castles north of the Brandenburgian Uckermark. During the confirmation of the Peace of Prenzlau in 1479, the border was finally settled north of Strasburg and Bogislav had to take his possessions as a fief from Brandenburg.

== Pomerelia ==
=== Poland, Brandenburg, and the Teutonic Order compete for Pomerelia (1294–1309) ===
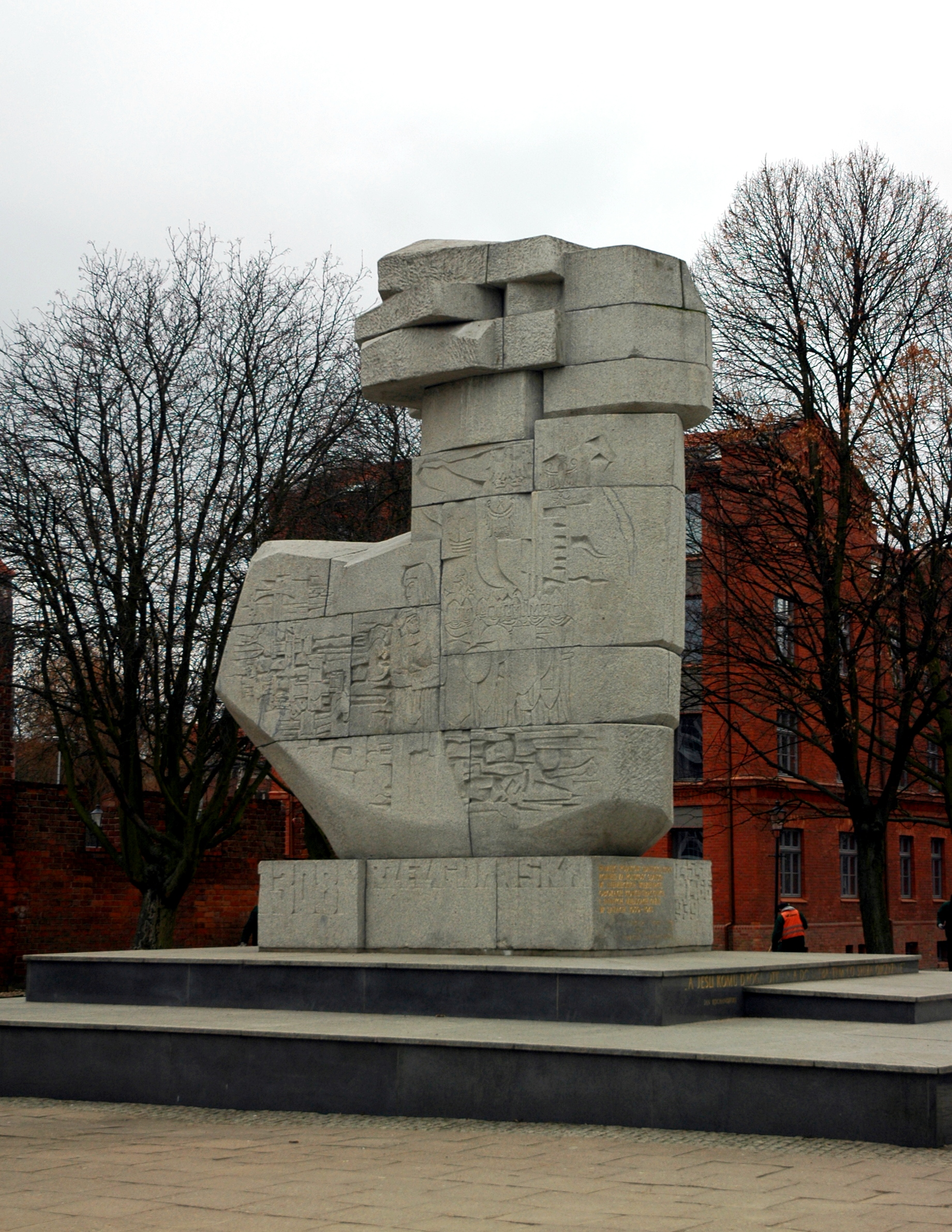
Monument to the victims of the Teutonic massacre of Gdańsk of 1308

After Mestwin II, the last member of the Samborides that ruled the Duchy of Pomerelia died in 1294, disputes over succession arose. Involved in internal dynastic conflicts, Mestwin had promised his duchy to Conrad, Margrave of Brandenburg-Stendal, for aiding him in his struggles with his brother, Wratislaw. Yet, in the 1282 Treaty of Kępno he named his ally Przemysł II, duke and later king of Poland, as his co-ruler and successor in Pomerelia. The Teutonic Order, who also held claims regarding Pomerelia, had inherited Gniew from Sambor II, thus gaining a foothold on the left bank of the Vistula.

At the beginning of the 14th century, the region was plunged into war involving local Pomeranian nobility and the principality of Margraviate of Brandenburg to the west, which had acquired some rights to a few localities in the Treaty of Arnswalde of 1269. Brandenburg's claim to the harbour city and Pomerania was partially based on a treaty of 8 August 1305 between the Rulers of Brandenburg and Wenceslaus III, promising the Meissen territory to the Bohemian crown in exchange for Pomerelia, although that treaty was never finalized.

On becoming king of Poland, in summer 1300, Wenceslaus II of Bohemia asked the Teutonic Knights to protect Pomerania from the claims of Brandenburg. In 1306 Władysław Łokietek's forces garrisoned Gdańsk. Also in 1306–07, Brandenburg took the Sławno, and in 1308 the land of Słupsk. When Gdańsk was subsequently attacked by the Margrave of Brandenburg in 1308, Łokietek was unable to help and called in the Teutonic Knights for support. The Brandenburgers were repelled. The Teutonic Knights however, took over the city and ousted the remaining Polish garrison from the castle. The Poles claimed that the Knights committed a massacre of 10,000 civilians; modern historians and archaeologists believe that while the number 10,000 is an exaggeration, an actual massacre of the populace did take place.

=== Pomerelia in the Teutonic Knights' monastic state (1309–1454/1466) ===
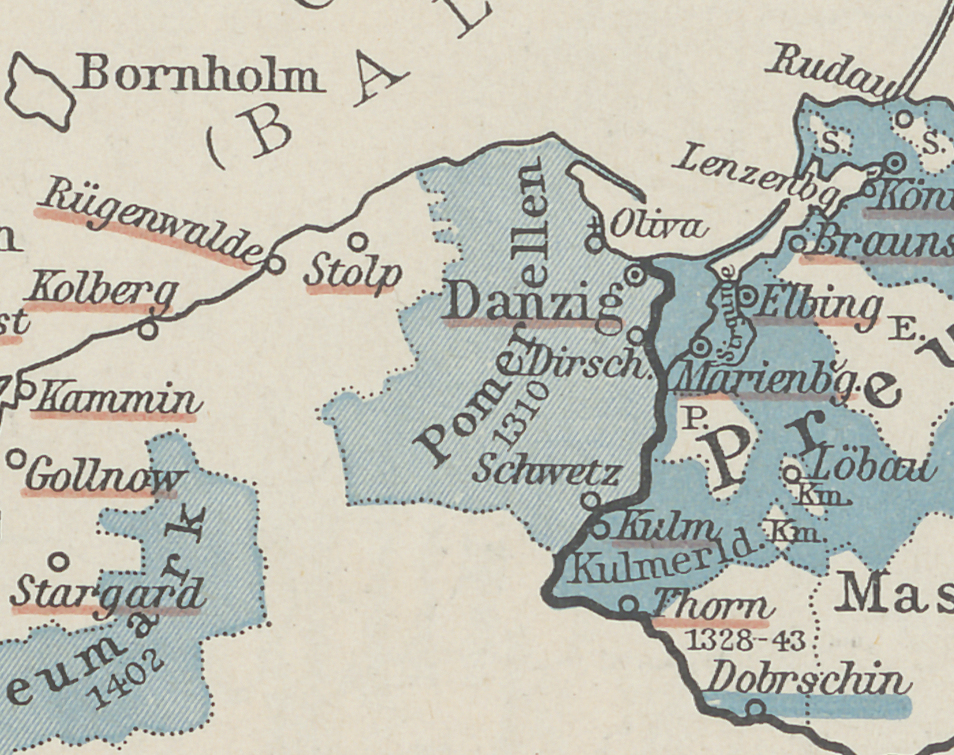
Pomerelia within the Teutonic Order

Teutonic Grandmaster Siegfried von Feuchtwangen joined Pomerelia to the Monastic state of the Teutonic Knights. The Margraves sold the area to the Teutonic Order in the 1309 Treaty of Soldin. Henry VI, Holy Roman Emperor ratified the Soldin Treaty in 1313. In the Treaty of Kalisz (1343), the Teutonic Order had to acknowledge that it would hold Pomerelia as a fief from the Kingdom of Poland. In 1410, during the Polish–Lithuanian–Teutonic War the city council of Gdańsk recognized the Polish king, Władysław II Jagiełło as its sovereign. After the end of the war in 1411, Jagiełło relieved the city of its oath of fealty and it reverted to Teutonic rule. Subsequently, the city's populace was repressed by the German knights as punishment for its support of the Polish king.

In regards to church administration, the region remained part of the Polish Diocese of Włocławek, a suffragan of the Archdiocese of Gniezno, only the Archdeaconry of Słupsk was dissolved in 1317 and Słupsk passed from the Archdiocese of Gniezno to the Diocese of Kamień.

In 1380, the first Scots settled in Gdańsk, founding what would eventually become a significant Scottish diaspora in Poland. First mention of Armenians, another historically important diaspora in Poland, in Gdańsk dates to 1427.

=== Return to Poland ===
Coat of arms of the Polish Pomeranian Voivodeship

In 1440, many cities of the region joined the newly formed anti-Teutonic Prussian Confederation. In 1454, the organization asked Polish King Casimir IV Jagiellon to reincorporate the region into the Kingdom of Poland, to which the King agreed and signed an act of re-incorporation in Kraków. After the subsequent Thirteen Years' War (1454–1466), the longest of all Polish–Teutonic wars, the Teutonic Knights renounced any claims to the region and recognized it as part of Poland.

Since 1454, Gdańsk was authorized by King Casimir IV to mint Polish coins. In 1458, a truce between Poland and Denmark was signed in Gdańsk, after Denmark initially sided with the Teutonic Knights in the Thirteen Years' War.

== Schlawe-Stolp as a part of Brandenburg, the Teutonic Knights' state and Pomerania-Wolgast ==
The districts of Sławno (Schlawe), Darłowo (Rügenwalde) and Słupsk (Stolp), however, remained with Brandenburg. Previously, they were part of Pomerelia.

In 1316–17, the Griffin duke of Pomerania-Wolgast took over these areas as a fief from Waldemar of Brandenburg. In 1347, the area became fully attached to Pomerania-Wolgast. The lands of Stolp were pawned to the Teutonic Order from 1329 to 1341, the Bytów area was bought by the knights in 1329 and thus remained outside Pomerania-Wolgast. The Swienca family was de facto ruling the area regardless of the respective overlord, their power was broken only by the dukes of Pomerania-Wolgast.

== Bibliography ==
- Buchholz, Werner, ed. (2002). Pommern (in German). Siedler. ISBN 3-88680-780-0.
- Buske, Norbert (1997). Pommern (in German). Schwerin: Helms. ISBN 3-931185-07-9.
- Calhoun, Craig J.; Gerteis, Joseph; Moody, James; Pfaff, Steven; Virk, Indermohan (2002). Contemporary Sociological Theory. Blackwell Publishing. ISBN 0-631-21350-3.
- Górski, Karol (1949). Związek Pruski i poddanie się Prus Polsce: zbiór tekstów źródłowych (in Polish and Latin). Poznań: Instytut Zachodni.
- Inachin, Kyra (2008). Die Geschichte Pommerns (in German). Rostock: Hinstorff. ISBN 978-3-356-01044-2.
- Krause, Gerhard; Balz, Horst Robert; Müller, Gerhard (1997). Theologische Realenzyklopädie. Walter de Gruyter. ISBN 3-11-015435-8.
- Piskorski, Jan Maria (1999). Pommern im Wandel der Zeiten (in German). Zamek Ksiazat Pomorskich. ISBN 83-906184-8-6. OCLC 43087092.
- Willoweit, Dietmar; Lemberg, Hans (2006). Reiche und Territorien in Ostmitteleuropa: Historische Beziehungen und politische Herrschaftslegitimation (in German). Oldenbourg Wissenschaftsverlag. ISBN 3-486-57839-1.
- Boockmann, Hartmut (1992). Die Anfänge der ständischen Vertretungen in Preussen und seinen Nachbarländern (in German). Oldenbourg Wissenschaftsverlag. ISBN 3-486-55840-4.
- du Moulin Eckart, Richard (1976). Geschichte der deutschen Universitäten (in German). Georg Olms Verlag. ISBN 3-487-06078-7.
- Stearns, Peter N; Langer, William Leonard (2001). The Encyclopedia of World History: Ancient, Medieval, and Modern, Chronologically Arranged. Houghton Mifflin Harcourt. ISBN 0-395-65237-5.
- MacKay, Angus; Ditchburn, David (1997). Atlas of Medieval Europe. Routledge. ISBN 0-415-01923-0.
- Abulafia, David, ed. (1999). The New Cambridge Medieval History Volume 5. Cambridge University Press. ISBN 978-0-521-36289-4.
- Pulsiano, Phillip; Wolf, Kirsten (1993). Medieval Scandinavia: An Encyclopedia. Taylor&Francis. ISBN 0-8240-4787-7.
