= Siege of Vierraden =

1425 battle in Brandenburg

- Part of Uckermark War
Date	1425
Location	Vierraden
Result	Pomeranian and Polish victory

Belligerents
Pomerania-Stettin; Pomerania-Wolgast; Pomerania-Stolp; Pomerania-Stargard; Mecklenburg-Stargard Crown of the Kingdom of Poland	Margraviate of Brandenburg

Commanders and leaders
Otto II; Casimir V Wartislaw IX; Bogislav IX; Henry Jan of Czarnków	Frederick I

Siege of Vierraden was a siege of the castle in Vierraden, that took place in early 1425, during Uckermark War. The castle was besieged by the army of Margraviate of Brandenburg led by Frederick I. The fight was eventually won by the forces of Pomerania-Stettin, Pomerania-Wolgast, Pomerania-Stolp, Pomerania-Stargard, Mecklenburg-Stargard, Crown of the Kingdom of Poland, and Branderburgish forces had retreated.

== History ==
After the invading armies of Pomerania-Stettin, Pomerania-Wolgast, Pomerania-Stolp, Pomerania-Stargard, Mecklenburg-Stargard, Crown of the Kingdom of Poland had captured the town of Prenzlau, Frederick I, leader of the Margraviate of Brandenburg, had attacked with his army, enemy lines alongside the Oder river, and besieging the castle in Vierraden, where he eventually got defeated by Polish and Pomeranian forces and was forced to retreat.

== Citations ==
=== Bibliography ===
- Edward Rymar, Wojny i spory pomorsko-brandenburskie w XV-XVI w, Wyd. Inforteditions, Zabrze, 2012.
