= Uckermark War (1425–1427) =

Date	1425 – 2 May 1427
Location	Uckermark, Brandenburg
Result	Allied victory

Belligerents
Pomerania-Stettin; Pomerania-Wolgast; Pomerania-Stolp; Pomerania-Stargard; Mecklenburg-Stargard; Crown of the Kingdom of Poland Werle (1425–1426)	Margraviate of Brandenburg

Commanders and leaders
Otto II; Casimir V Wartislaw IX; Bogislav IX; Henry; Jan of Czarnków; Christopher of Werle † (1425–1426) William of Werle (1425–1426)	Frederick I John

Uckermark War (Note: Polish: Wojna wkrzańska) was a military conflict fought in Uckermark, Brandenburg, between 1425 and 2 May 1427. It was fought by Pomerania-Stettin, Pomerania-Wolgast, Pomerania-Stolp, Pomerania-Stargard, Mecklenburg-Stargard, Crown of the Kingdom of Poland, and Werle, attacking the Margraviate of Brandenburg.

== History ==
At the beginning of 1425, armies of Pomerania-Stettin led by Otto II and Casimir V, Pomerania-Wolgast led by Wartislaw IX, Pomerania-Stolp and Pomerania-Stargard led by Bogislav IX, and Mecklenburg-Stargard led by Henry, and forces of Greater Poland nobility from the Crown of the Kingdom of Poland, led by Jan of Czarnków under Stettin command, had invaded Uckermark in Margraviate of Brandenburg, that was ruled by Frederick I. The attacking army had the approval of Sigismund, the Holy Roman Emperor. On 15 February 1425, the invading armies had captured the town of Prenzlau. In the response, Frederick I had attacked with his army, alongside the Oder river, and besieging the castle in Vierraden, where he eventually got defeated by Polish and Pomeranian forces.

On 1 May 1425, the invading states had signed an anty-Branderburgish alliance in Demmin with Christopher and William, co-rulers of Werle. In February 1426, Frederick had traveled to Franconia, where he had organized the mercenary forces. At the same time, his son, John, on 25 August 1425, had led his army in a victorious battle of Pritzwalk, during which Christopher of Werle had died. On 23 August 1426, John and Frederick recaptured the town of Prenzlau, and on 12 October 1426, he had signed a peace treaty with William of Werle. On 22 May 1427, both sides had signed a peace treaty in Eberswalde, ending the war. In the treaty, Pomerania-Stettin was given a few neighboring towns.

== Citations ==
=== Bibliography ===
- Edward Rymar, Wojny i spory pomorsko-brandenburskie w XV-XVI w, Wyd. Inforteditions, Zabrze, 2012.
- J.W. Szymański, Książęcy ród Gryfitów, Goleniów–Kielce, 2006, ISBN 83-7273-224-8.
