= Battle of Kremmen Levee (1332) =

1332 battle of Brandenburg–Pomeranian War

Battle of Kremmer Levee
- Part of Brandenburg–Pomeranian War
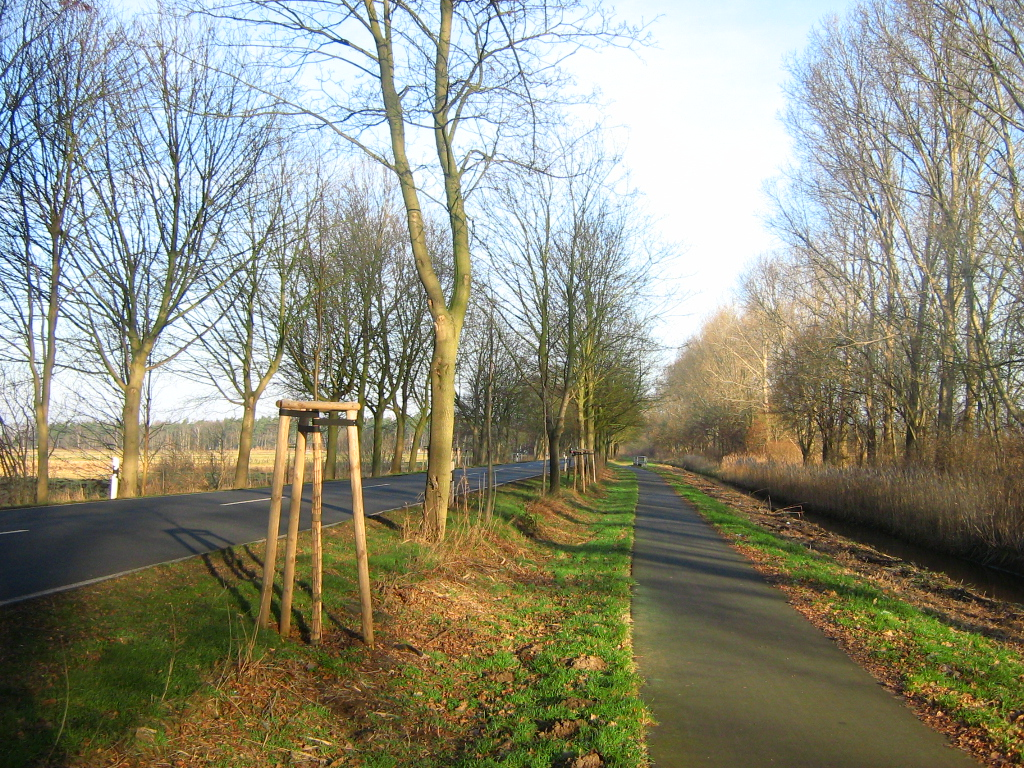
- Kremmer Levee in 2008.
Date	1 August 1332
Location	Kremmer Levee, near Kremmen, Brandenburg
Result	Pomeranian victory

Belligerents
Pomerania-Stettin; Werle County of Schwerin	Margraviate of Brandenburg

Commanders and leaders
Otto I Barnim III	Louis V

Battle of Kremmer Levee (Note: German: Schlacht am Kremmer Damm; Polish: bitwa pod Kremmer Damm, bitwa na Kremskiej Grobli) was a final battle of Brandenburg–Pomeranian War, fought on 1 August 1332, on the Kremmer Levee, near the village of Kremmen. It was fought by forces of Pomerania-Stettin, Werle, and County of Schwerin, against the Margraviate of Brandenburg.

== History ==
In 1329, dukes Otto I and Barnim III, the co-rulers of Pomerania-Stettin, had allied themselves with Werle and County of Schwerin, following which, they attacked the Margraviate of Brandenburg. The war lasted until 1 August 1332, when, Pomeranian forces had won during the battle of Kremmer Levee.

== In popular culture ==
Theodor Fontane had written a folk song (Lied) about the battle.

== Citations ==
=== Bibliography ===
- Martin Wehrmann, Geschichte von Pommern, vol. 1, 2. Friedrich Andreas Perthes, Gotha 1919–21. Reprint by Weltbild Verlag, 1992, ISBN 3-89350-112-6.
- Edward Rymar, Jedna bitwa pomorsko-brandenburska na Kremskiej Grobli (w 1412 r.) i bitwa Barnima III księcia szczecińskiego z Wedlami (w 1332 r.) in: Kaci, święci, templariusze, Błażej Śliwiński (redictor), Studia z Dziejów Średniowiecza nr 14
- Theodor Fontane, Wanderungen durch die Mark Brandenburg, vol. 5.
