= Bogislaw VII =

Bogislaw VII, Duke of Pomerania
- Born: before 1355
- Died: 1404
- Noble family: House of Griffin
- Father: Barnim III, Duke of Pomerania
- Mother: Agnes of Brunswick-Grubenhagen

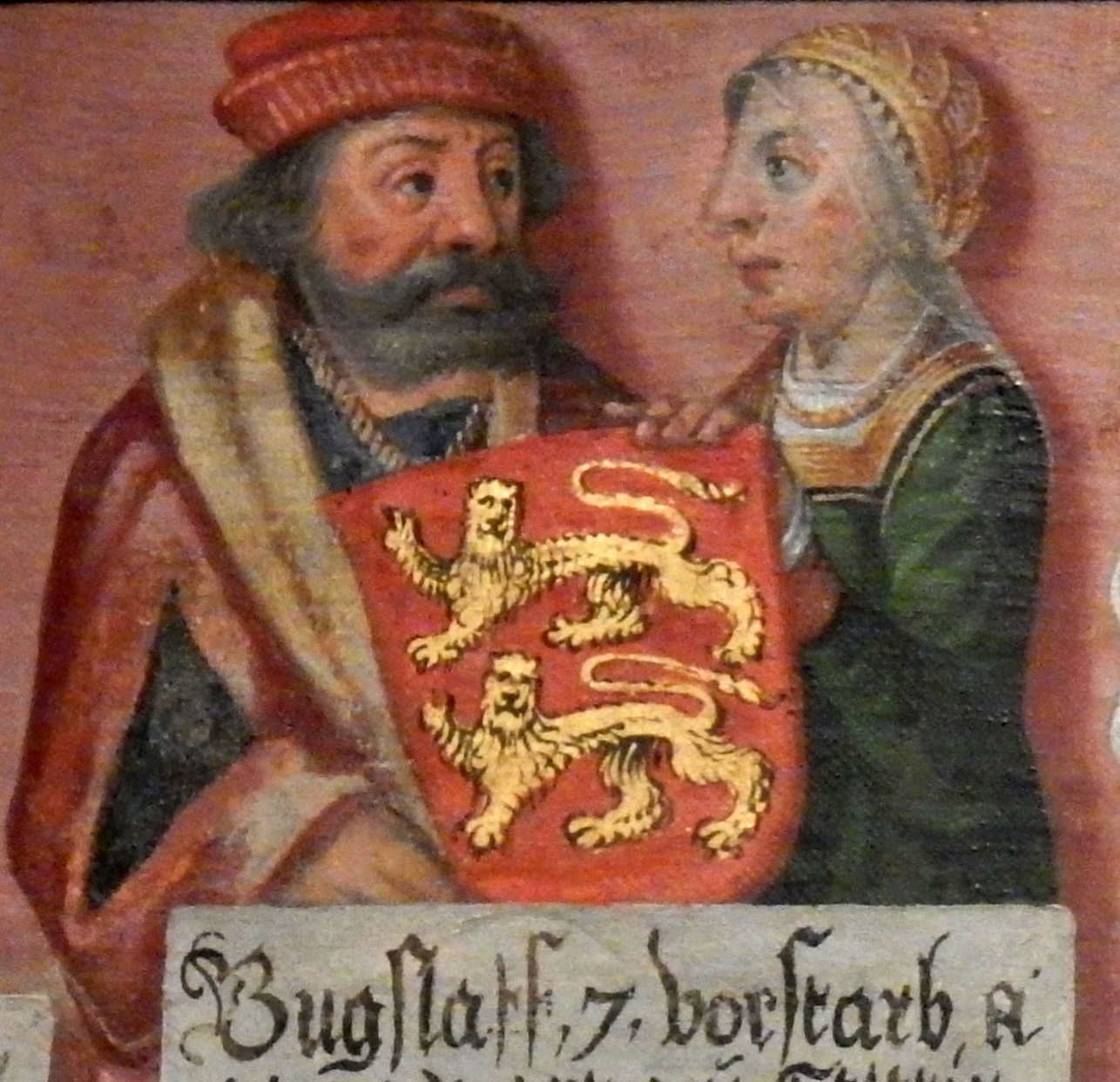
BogislawVII.JPG

Bogislaw VII (before 1355 – 1404) was a Duke of Pomerania-Stettin from the House of Griffin.

== Life ==
Bogislaw VII was the son of Duke Barnim III "the church founder" (c. 1303 – 1368) and his wife, Agnes of Brunswick-Grubenhagen. After his father's death in 1368, he ruled Pomerania-Stettin jointly with his older brothers Casimir III and Swantibor III.

Casimir III died in battle in 1372 during a war against Brandenburg. Swantibor III and Bogislaw VII continued to rule Pomerania-Stettin jointly. Bogislaw VII is described as a Duke, equal in status to his older brothers. He was, however, overshadowed by them.

Bogislaw VII died in 1404. After his death, his brother Swantibor III ruled Pomerania-Stettin alone.

The Codex Gelre, a collection of coats of arms from the late 14th Century, mentions a "Duke of Groswin". This may have been Bogislaw VII.

== See also ==
- List of Pomeranian duchies and dukes
