= Ducal Castle, Szczecin =

Castle in Poland

Ducal Castle
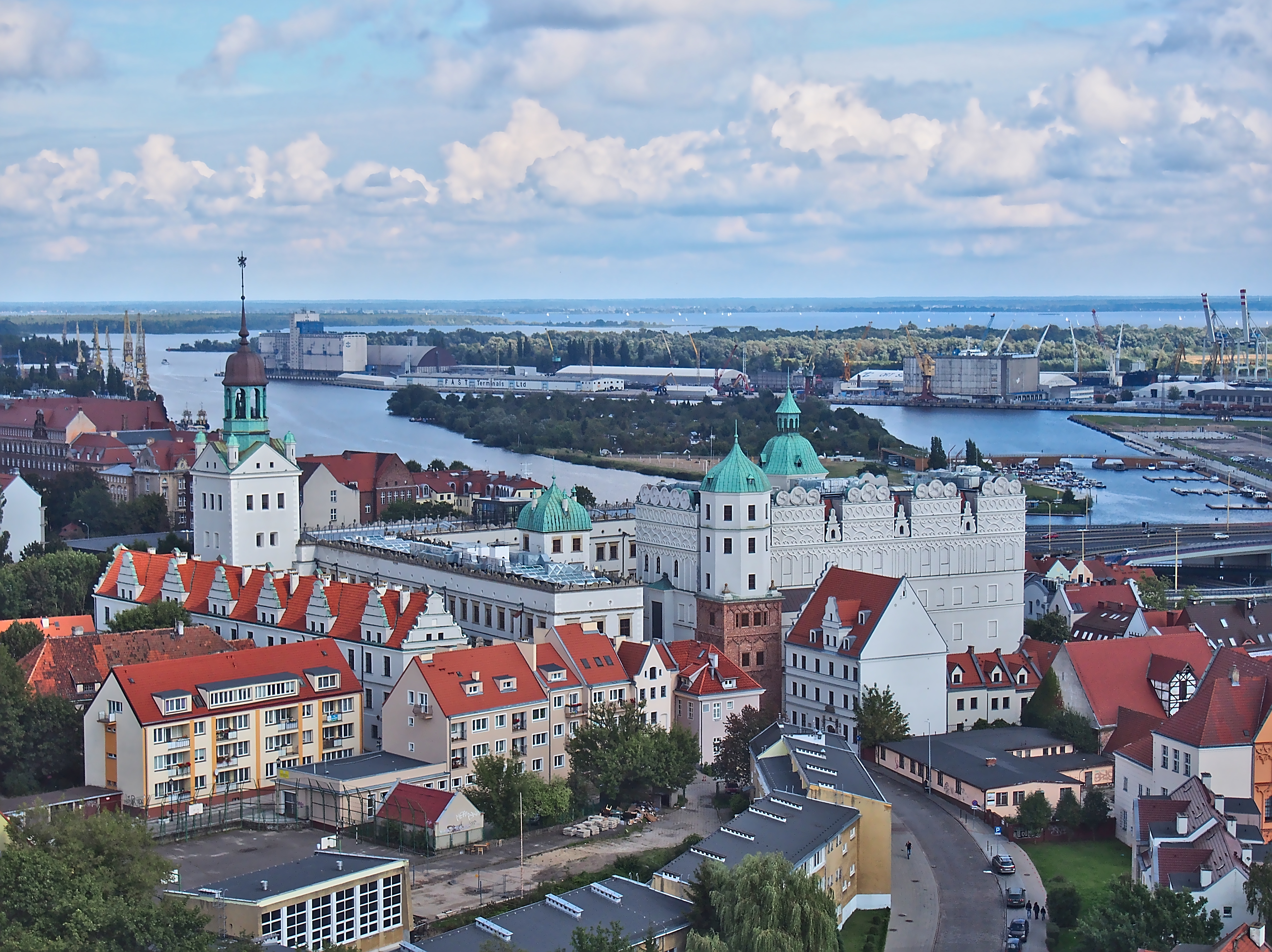
- General view of the castle
- Interactive map of the Ducal Castle area

General information
- Architectural style: Gothic, Pomeranian mannerism
- Location: Szczecin, Poland
- Coordinates: 53°25′34″N 14°33′37″E
- Construction started: 1346
- Completed: 1428
- Renovated: 1958–1980

Design and construction
- Architects: Wilhelm Zachariasz Italus (mannerist reconstruction)

The Ducal Castle, also known as the Castle of the Dukes of Pomerania, (Note: Polish: Zamek Książąt Pomorskich; German: Schloss der Pommerschen Herzöge, Schloss der Pommerschen Fürsten) and the Szczecin Castle, (Note: German: Stettiner Schloss) is a renaissance castle in the city of Szczecin, Poland, located at the Castle Hill in the Stare Miasto (Old Town) neighbourhood, near the Oder river. It is built in the gothic and Pomeranian mannerism architectural style. The castle was the seat of the dukes of Pomerania-Stettin of the House of Pomerania, who ruled the Duchy of Pomerania from 1121 to 1637. The building history originates in 1346, when Duke Barnim III began the construction of the ducal housing complex, and continues to 1428, when, under the rule of Casimir V, it was expanded, forming the castle. Currently, it is one of the largest cultural centres in the West Pomeranian Voivodeship.

== History ==
Barnim the Great of Pomerania-Stettin erected the castle within Szczecin's walls against the will of the burghers in 1346; an older Pomeranian fortification had been leveled in 1249. In 1490 the castle was partially reconstructed for Bogusław X's wedding with Anna Jagiellonka (daughter of King Casimir IV Jagiellon).

Between 1573 and 1582 the castle was rebuilt again, this time in the mannerist style for Duke John Frederick by Italian stonemasons according to design by Wilhelm Zachariasz Italus. Two new wings were added to close the courtyard before the medieval southern and eastern wings. The main gate was adorned with ducal crest, the eastern wing was enhanced and the northern wing was intended for chapel.

In 1648, due to the tenets of the Peace of Westphalia, the castle become a seat of Swedish governor. Before 1705, another reconstruction prepared the castle for the Queen of Poland, Catherine Opalińska, who lived here with her daughters Anna and Marie Leszczyńska (future Queen of France) and a small court between 1705 and 1711. In 1711 King Stanisław I Leszczyński, seeking refuge from pursuing Saxon and Russian forces, joined his wife and daughters at the castle.

After the Great Northern War, in 1720, the city of Stettin become part of Prussia and the castle was allocated to the garrison commander Christian August, Prince of Anhalt-Zerbst, whose daughter Sophie Friederike Auguste (the future Catherine II of Russia) was born here in 1729 and was raised in the castle. Since 1721, French church services of the city's French Huguenot community were held in the castle chapel.

Under Swedish and later Prussian rule, the castle was extensively modified. In 1840-1842, a tower in Classical architecture in allusion to the architecture of Karl Friedrich Schinkel was erected, and the south wing was built in the style of Frederician Rococo.

Polish conservators maintain that these modifications during Prussian rule in the 19th century were barbaric, devastating the many Renaissance elements in the castle (arcades, attics, vaulting). About 60% of the castle was destroyed during World War II.

Under Polish rule, the castle was rebuilt between 1958 and 1980 with some modifications. The castle was seen as a point of contact with the lost Slavic past of Szczecin, supporting and legitimizing the expulsion of the German population and consequent Polonization of the city. The castle was restored to its original 16th-century appearance according to Matthäus Merian's engraving of 1653 and other sources. The reference to the Renaissance appearance was important because during that time the city, then part of the Holy Roman Empire, was ruled by the House of Griffin, whose Slavic or even Piast descent is debated among historians.

== Gallery ==
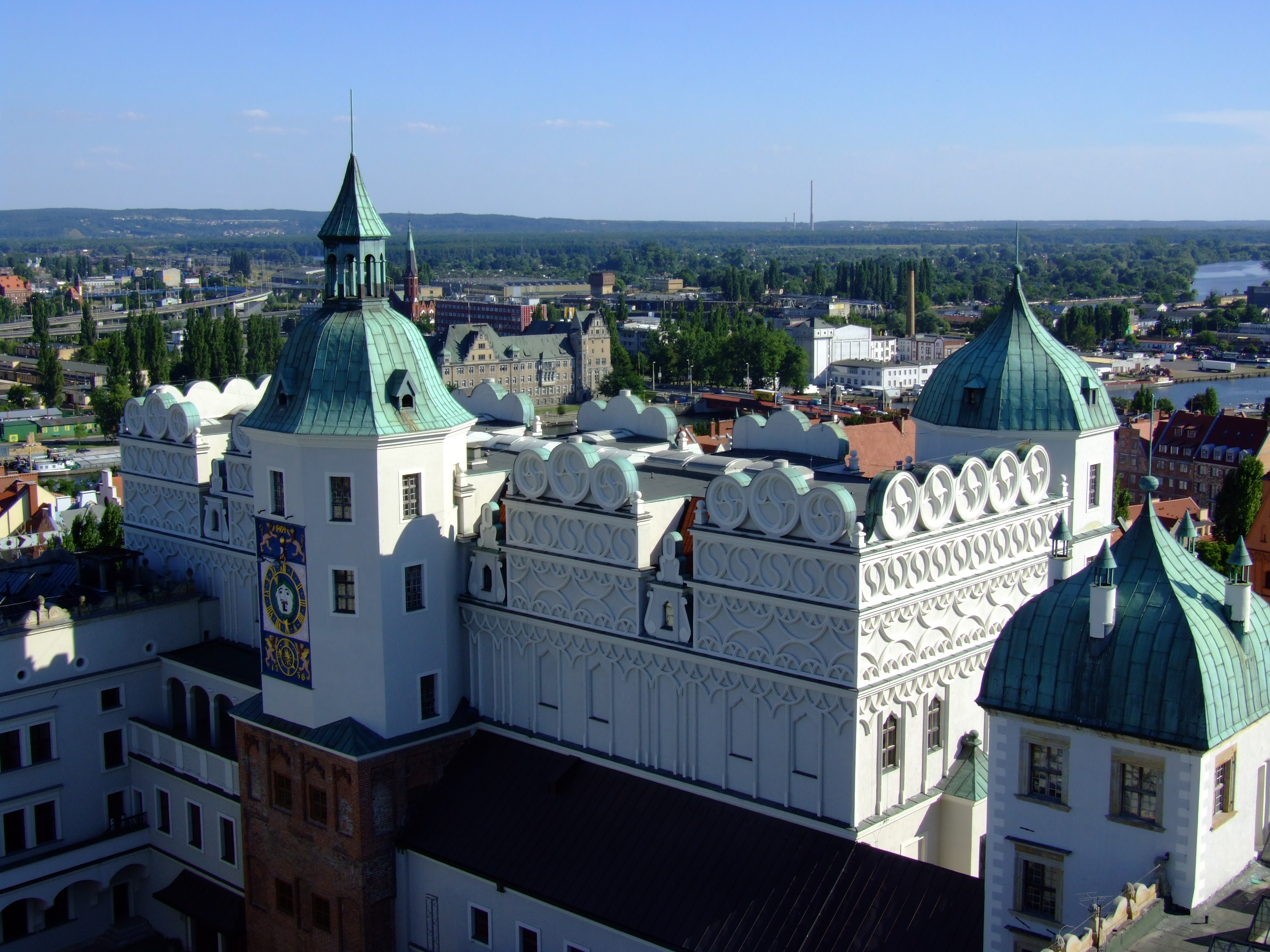
View from one of the towers

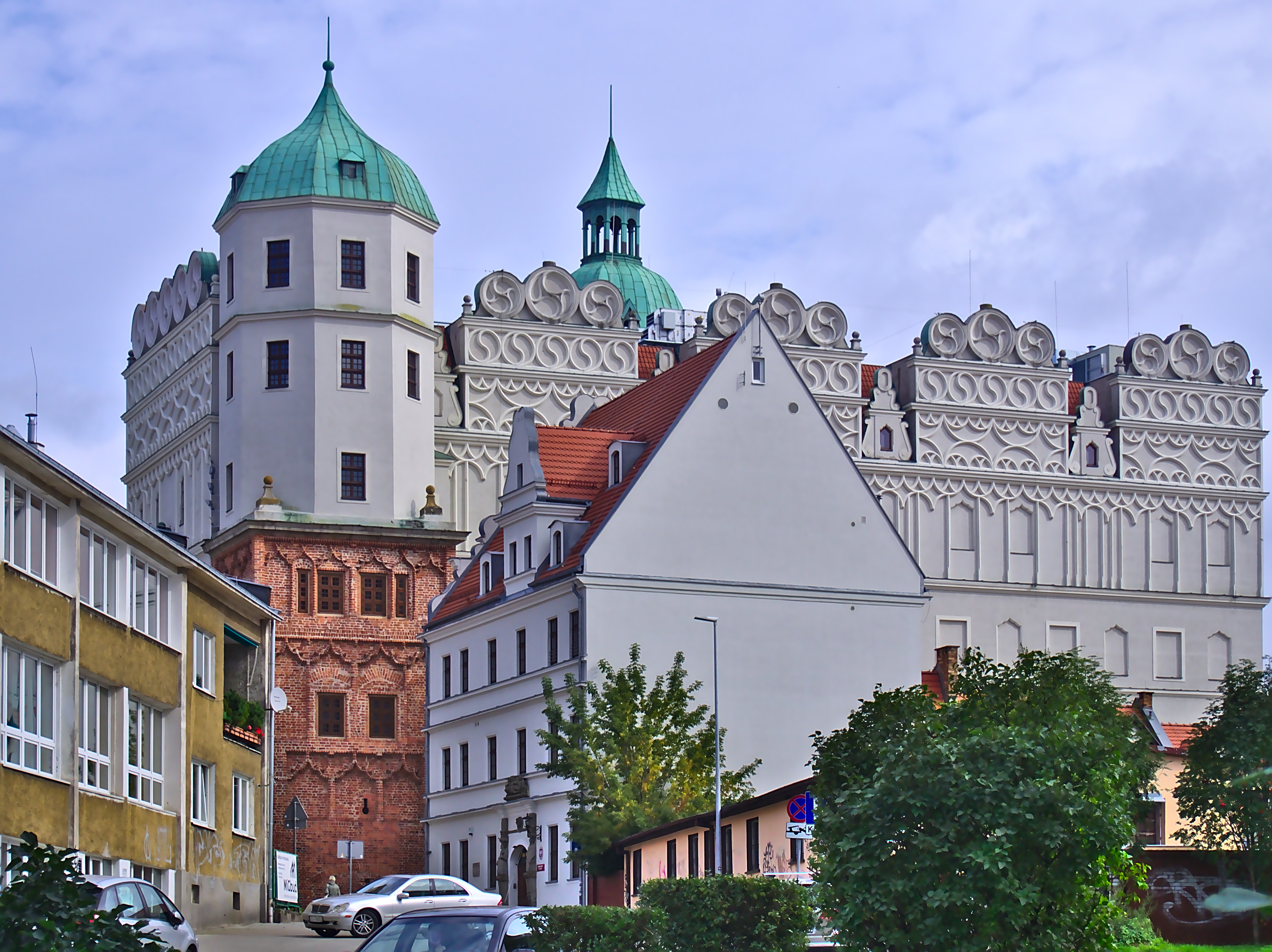
The Ducal Castle in Szczecin

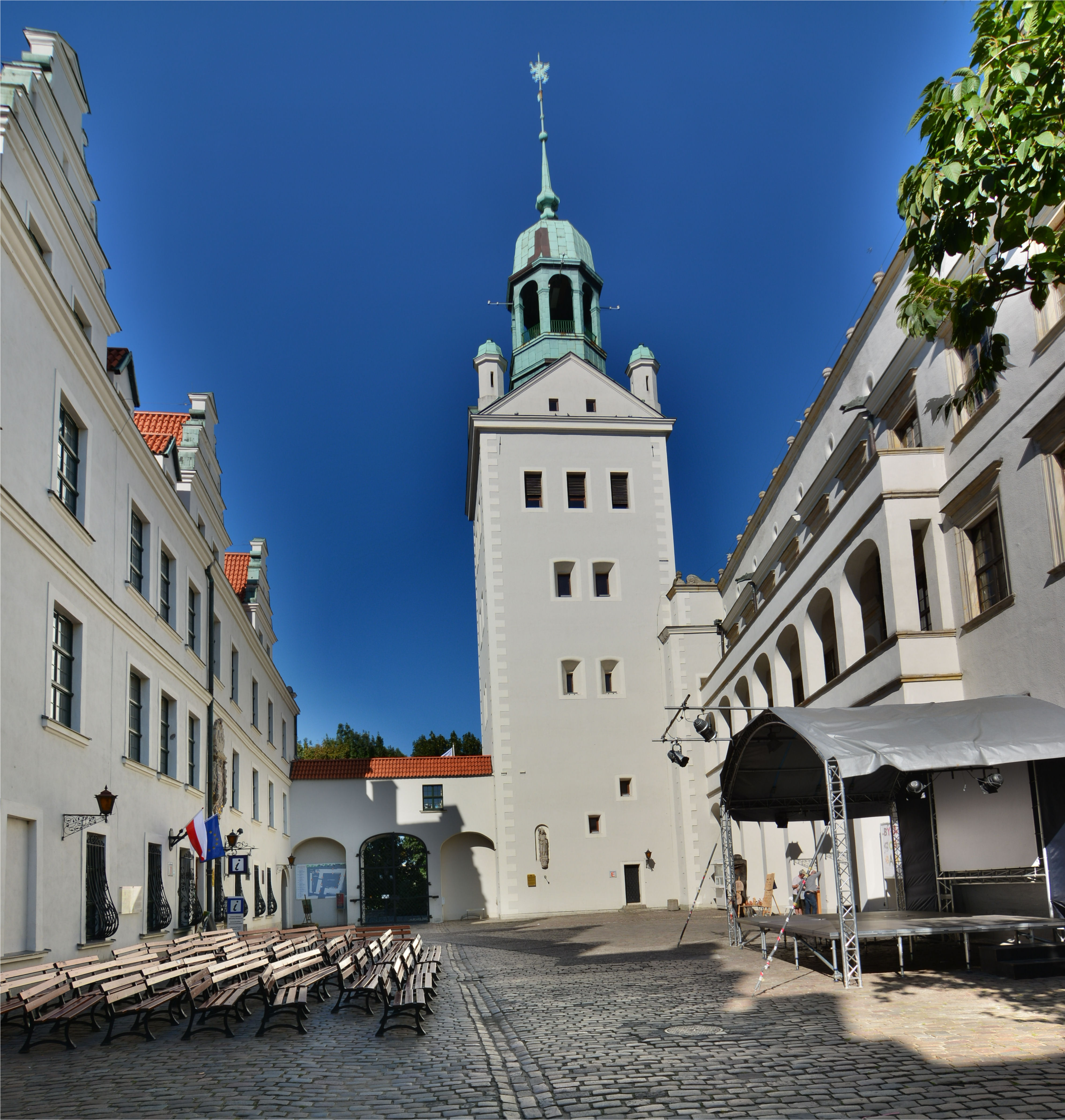
The tower seen from the courtyard

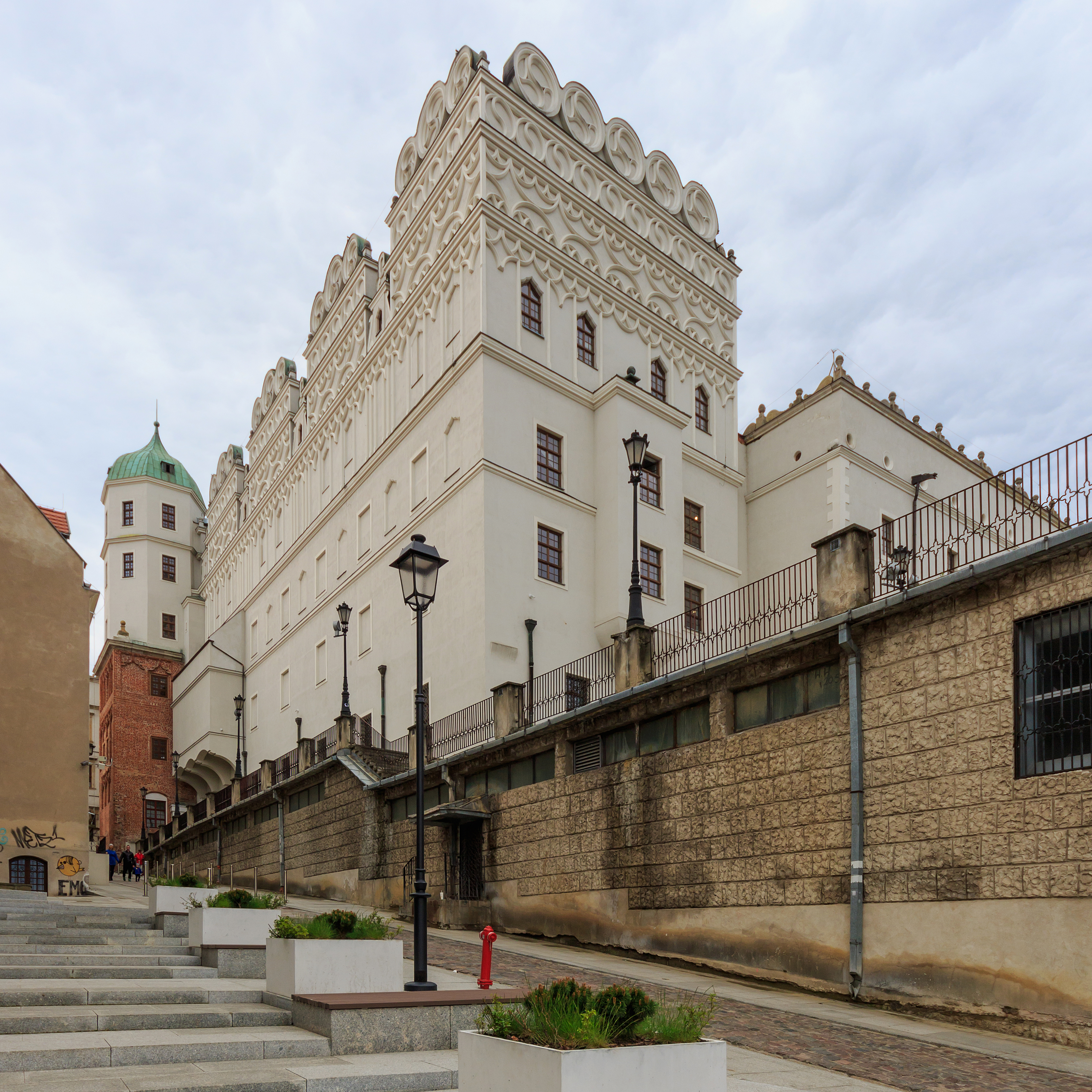
Side view with one of the towers

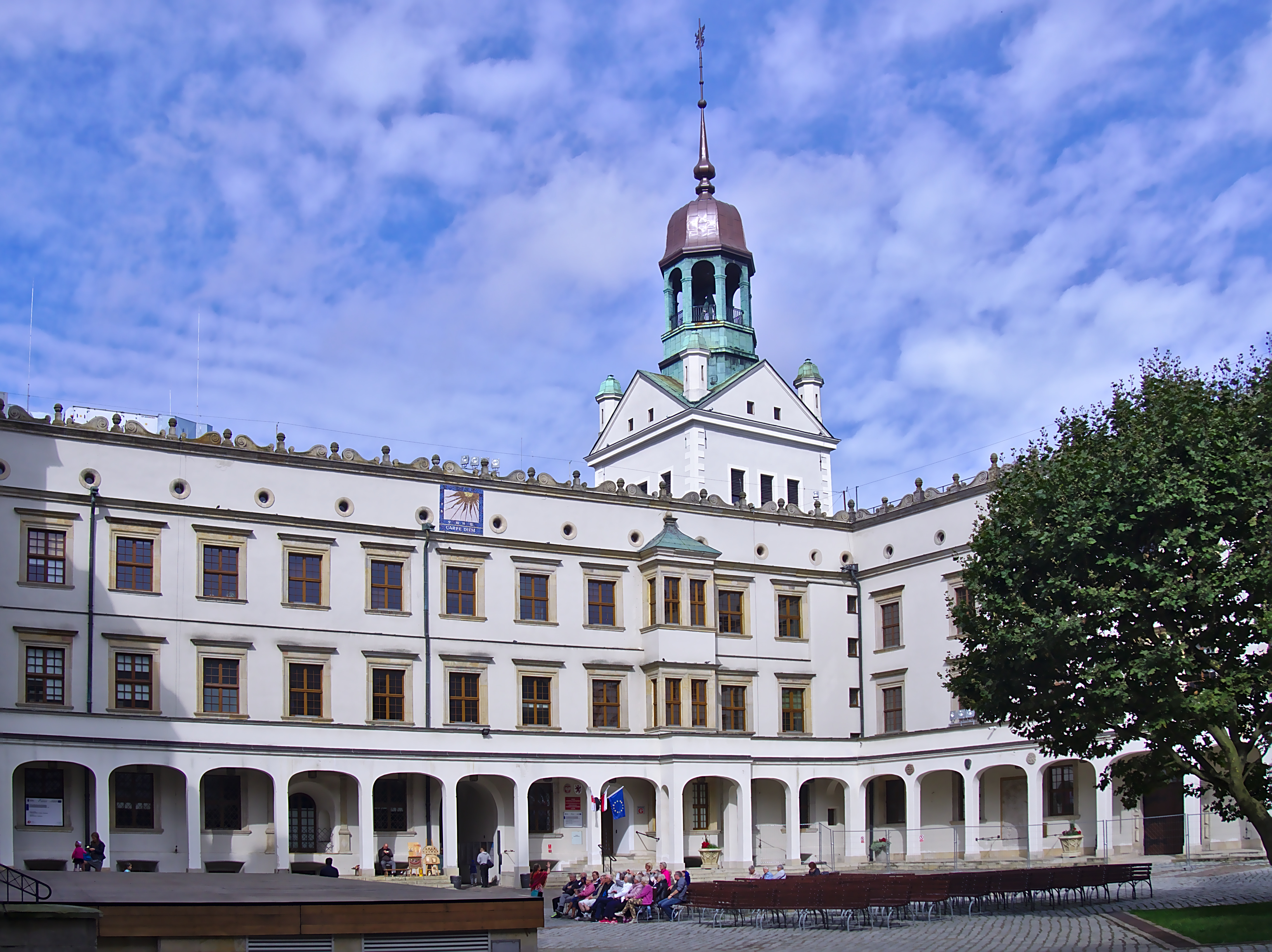
Inner courtyard

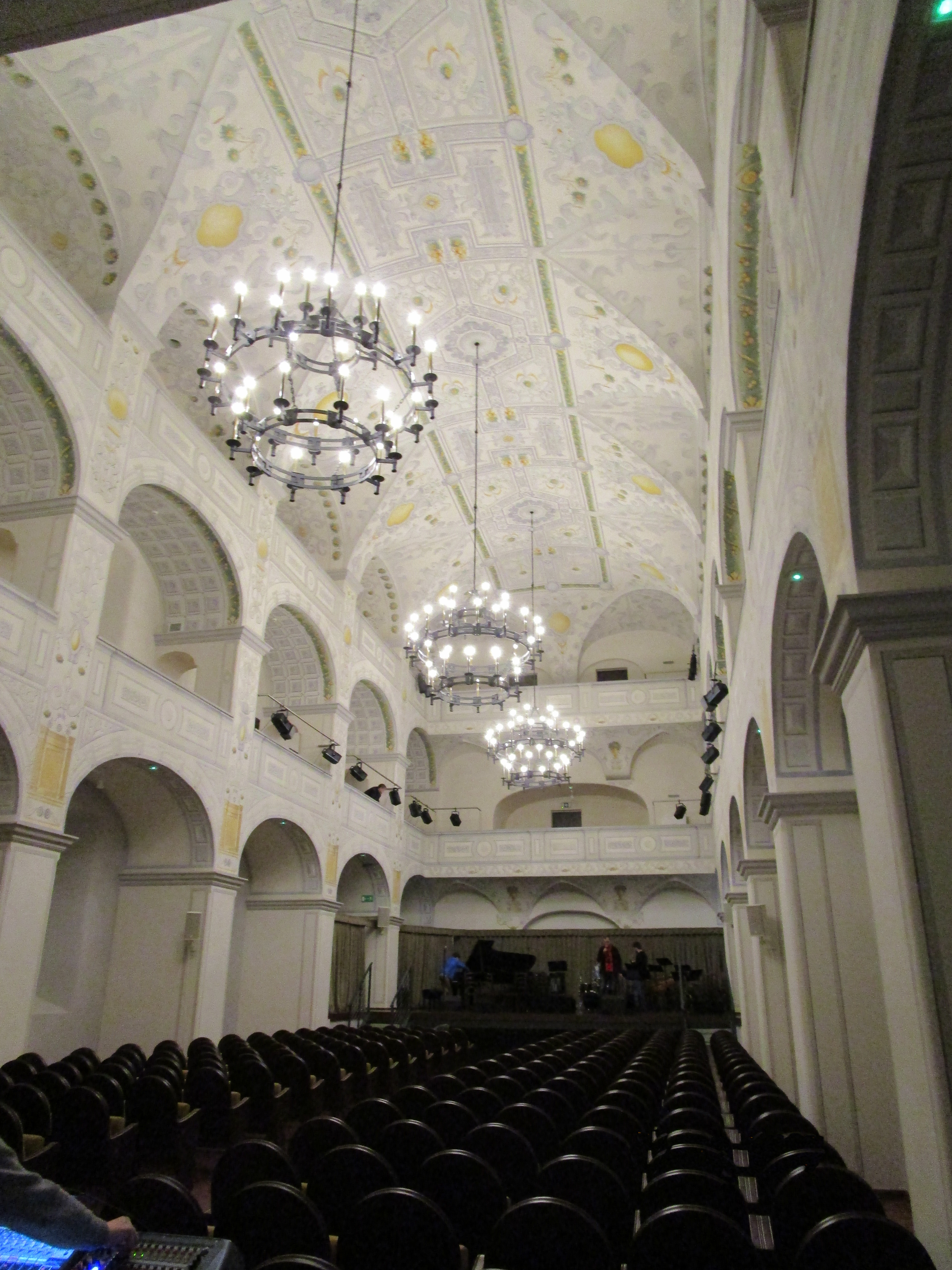
Former castle chapel

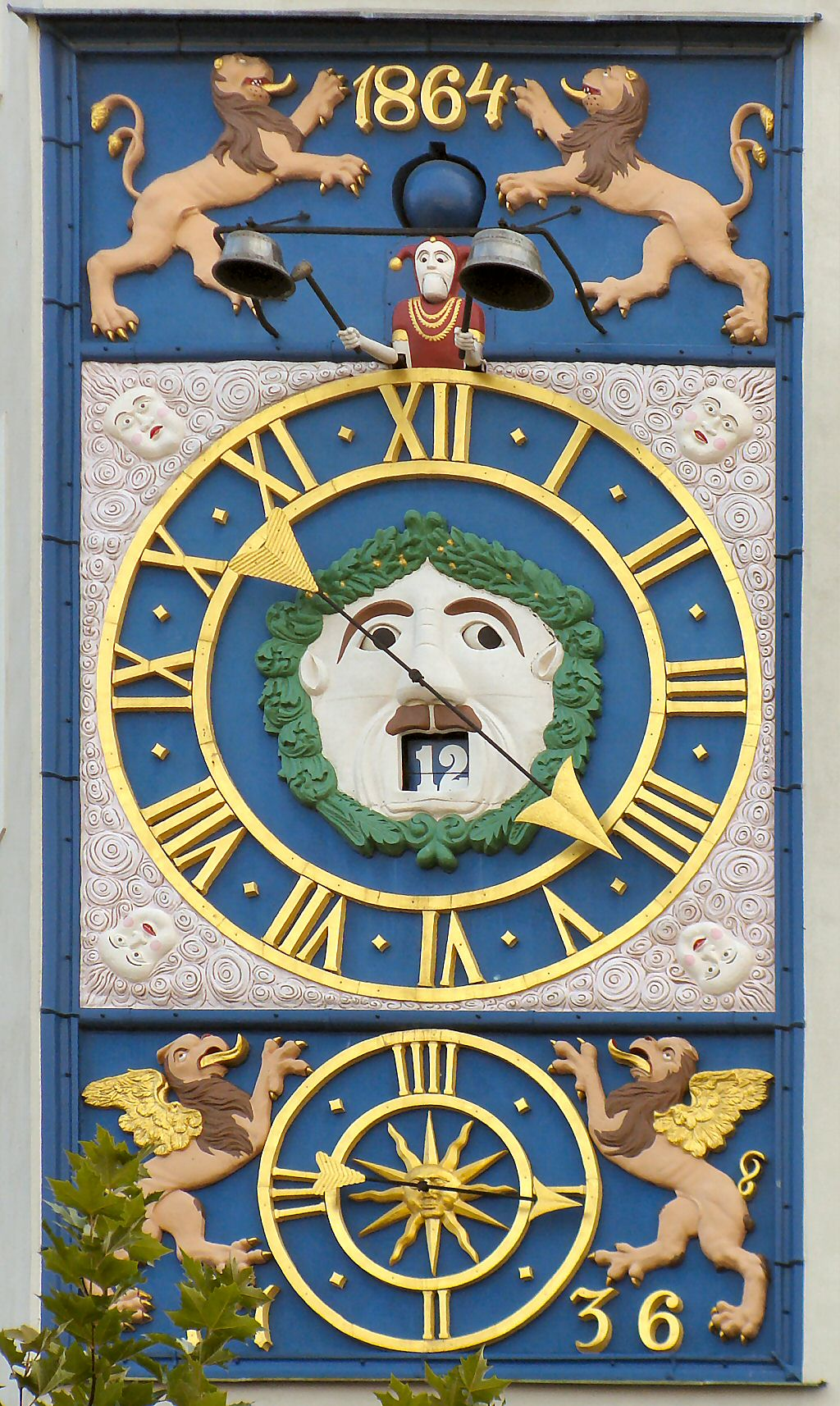
Clock on the castle's clock tower

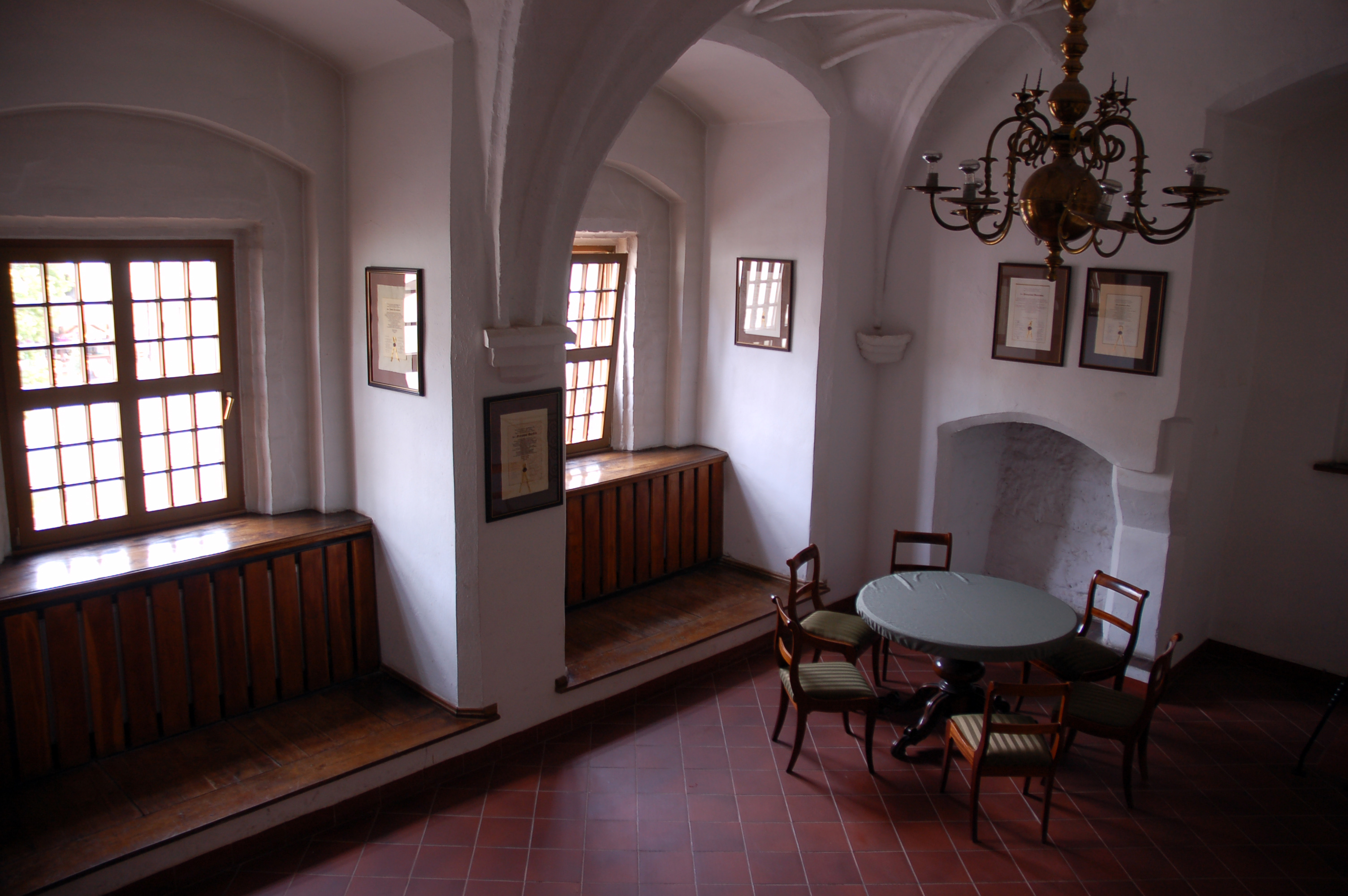
One of the chambers

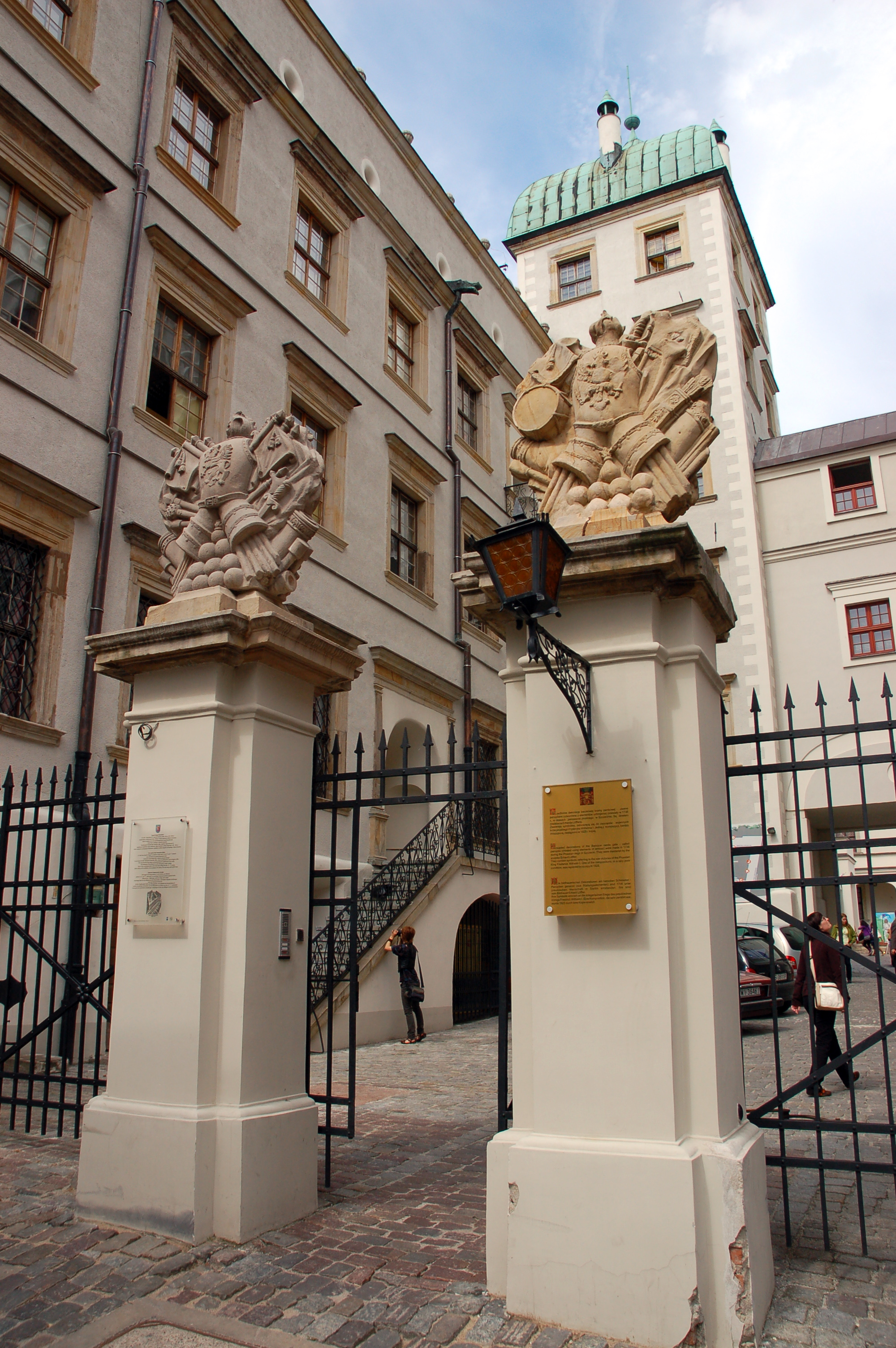
Gate

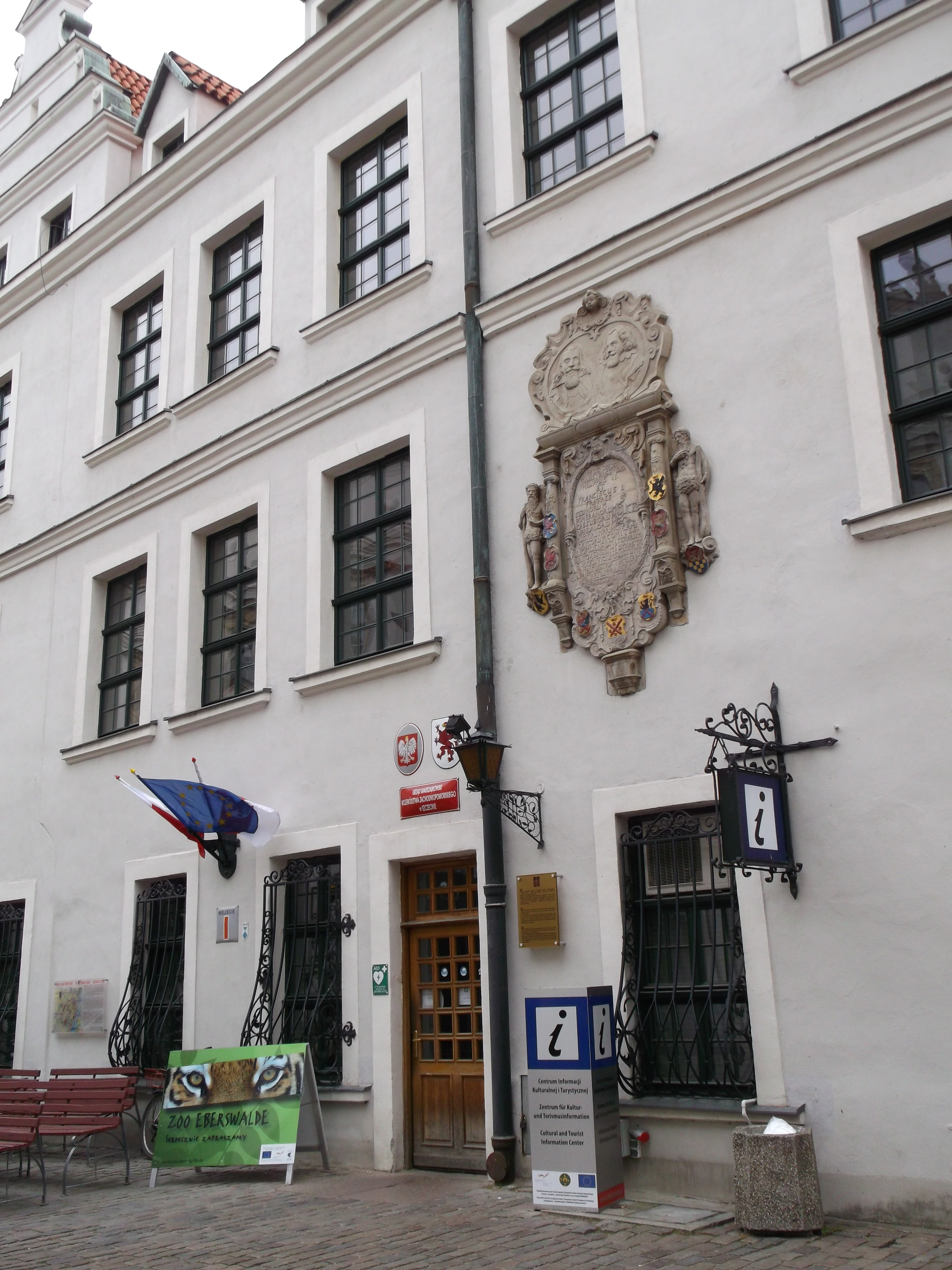
Culture and Tourism Center

== See also ==
- List of mannerist structures in Northern Poland
- Castles in Poland
