= Otto II of Pomerania =

Otto II, Duke of Pomerania
- Born: c. 1380
- Died: 27 March 1428
- Noble family: House of Griffin
- Spouse: Agnes of Mecklenburg
- Father: Swantibor III, Duke of Pomerania
- Mother: Anna of Hohenzollern

Otto II (c. 1380 – 27 March 1428) was a Duke of Pomerania-Stettin from the House of Griffin.

== Life ==
Otto II was the eldest son of Duke Swantibor III, of Pomerania-Stettin and his wife Anna of Hohenzollern.

When Otto was about 20 years old, his father tried to make him the Archbishop of Riga, which, against the will of the Teutonic Knights, who preferred John of Wallenrode as Archbishop. Otto was confirmed as Archbishop in 1394 by King Wenceslaus and in 1396, he went to Dorpat, where he created an alliance with Grand Duke Vytautas of Lithuania. In the following years, however, the Teutonic Order prevailed and Otto returned to Pomerania and this episode was without lasting results.

Otto's father, Duke Swantibor III, had been governor of the Mittelmark, a part of Brandenburg since 1409. When Burgrave Frederick VI of Nuremberg, the later Elector Frederick I of Brandenburg, was appointed Margrave of Brandenburg by Emperor Sigismund and Duke Swantibor hung on to his post as governor of the Mittelmark, armed clashes between the two resulted. Swantibor III retired in 1412 and left government to his two sons Otto II and Casimir V. They fought the inconclusive Battle of Kremmer Damm against Brandenburg on 12 October 1412.

When Duke Swantibor III died on 21 June 1413, Otto II and Casimir V decided to rule Pomerania-Stettin jointly. The war with Brandenburg continued. In 1415, Emperor Sigismund outlawed Otto II and Casimir V, at the request of Frederick I. On 16 December 1415, the brothers signed a peace treaty with Frederick in Eberswalde. Pomerania gave up the Uckermark, Boitzenburg and Zehdenick in exchange for monetary compensation. Nevertheless, the fighting continued, with varying results. In 1419, Otto II took the city of Prenzlau. However, in 1420, he suffered a crushing defeat at Angermünde and he lost Prenzlau again. In 1425, Otto II and Casimir V managed to capture Prenzlau by surprise. However, they lost it again in 1426.

Brandenburg raised the question of Pomerania's imperial immediacy. Brandenburg claimed that Pomerania was a fief of Brandenburg; the Duke of Pomerania claimed they were immediately subordinate to the Empire. In 1417, Emperor Sigismund invested Otto II with Pomerania-Stettin, subject to the rights of Brandenburg; in 1424, Casimir V was invested by the Emperor without such a restriction.

In 1426, Frederick abdicated in favor of his eldest son John. Later that year, Otto II and Casimir V made peace with John and on 16 June 1427, a peace treaty was signed in Templin between John and all the Dukes of Pomerania.

Otto II died on 27 March 1428. From that date, his brother Casimir V ruled Pomerania-Stettin alone.

== Marriage ==
Otto II was married to Agnes of Mecklenburg, a daughter of Duke John II of Mecklenburg-Stargard. They had no children.

Sometimes it is alleged that Otto had earlier married a daughter of Grand Duke Vytautas of Lithuania. According to the historian Martin Wehrmann, there is no evidence for such a marriage and the rumour is probably based on the alliance between Otto and Vytautas.

== Ancestors ==
Ancestors of Otto II of Pomerania

16. Barnim I, Duke of Pomerania
8. Otto I, Duke of Pomerania
17. Matilda of Brandenburg-Salzwedel
4. Barnim III, Duke of Pomerania
18. Gerhard II, Count of Holstein-Plön
9. Elisabeth of Holstein
19. Ingeborg of Sweden
2. Swantibor III, Duke of Pomerania
20. Henry I, Duke of Brunswick-Grubenhagen
10. Henry II, Duke of Brunswick-Lüneburg
21. Agnes of Meissen
5. Agnes of Brunswick-Grubenhagen
22. Henry I, Margrave of Brandenburg-Stendal
11. Judith of Brandenburg-Stendal
23. Agnes of Bavaria
1. Otto II, Duke of Pomerania
24. Frederick III of Nuremberg
12. Frederick IV, Burgrave of Nuremberg
25. Helene of Saxony
6. Albert of Zollern
26. Albert of Carinthia
13. Margaret of Gorizia
27. Agnes of Hohenberg
3. Anna of Nuremberg
28. Berthold IV, Count of Henneberg-Schleusingen
14. Henry IV, Count of Henneberg-Schleusingen
29. Adelaide of Hesse
7. Sophie of Henneberg-Schleusingen
30. Herman, Margrave of Brandenburg-Salzwedel
15. Judith of Brandenburg-Salzwedel
31. Anne of Austria

== See also ==
- List of Pomeranian duchies and dukes
