= Swantibor I =

- Born: c. 1351
- Died: 21 June 1413
- Buried: Cistercian monastery at Kołbacz
- Noble family: House of Griffin
- Spouse: Anna of Nuremberg
- Issue: Otto II; Casimir V Margaret
- Father: Barnim III, Duke of Pomerania
- Mother: Agnes of Brunswick-Grubenhagen

Swantibor I, (Note: Polish: Świętobor I) previously referred to by historians as Swantibor III (Note: Polish: Świętobor III) (c. 1351 – 21 June 1413) was a member of the House of Griffin, a Duke of Pomerania-Stettin and for a while governor of the Mittelmark.

== Life ==
Duke Swantibor I was a son of Barnim III, nicknamed the church founder (born: c. 1303; died: 1368), who ruled in the Teilherzogtum of Pomerania-Stettin. After Barnim III's death in 1368, his three surviving sons Casimir III, Swantibor I and Bogislaw VII ruled Pomerania-Stettin jointly.

At the time of their succession to power, Denmark under King Waldemar IV of Denmark was at war with the Hanseatic League and its allies, in particular Duke Albert II of Mecklenburg. The late Duke Barnim III had sided with Denmark. His sons, however, made peace with Albert on 7 November 1368 and took a neutral stance towards Denmark. This brought them into conflict with Margrave Otto of Brandenburg, who sided with Denmark. This conflict escalated to war. Duke Casimir III died during the siege of Chojna in 1372.

After Casimir's death, Swantibor I and Bogislaw VII ruled jointly, with Swantibor I now playing the leading role. He was faced with the challenge to maintain the position of Pomerania, which was splintered into several Teilherzogtumer, against its neighbours, in particular, against Brandenburg. When Emperor Charles IV (1316–1378) tried to win Brandenburg for his relatives, Swantibor initially feared that Charles IV would revive old claims that Brandenburg held suzerainty over Pomerania. On 17 May 1373 all the Pomeranian dukes, that is, Swantibor I and Bogislaw VII from Pomerania-Stettin, Wartislaw VI and Bogislaw VI from Pomerania-Wolgast, Bogislaw V of Pomerania-Stolp and Philip of Rehberg, Bishop of Cammin, joined forces to protect their interests and their common ownership of Pomerania. When Emperor Charles IV had acquired Brandenburg for his family by the Treaty of Fürstenwalde of 15 August 1373, however, Charles initiated a friendly relation with the Pomeranian dukes, contrary to their expectations, perhaps because he had married Bogislaw V's daughter, Elisabeth of Pomerania. Charles IV was particularly friendly with Swantibor, who occasionally participated in imperial affairs, and who served as an imperial judge.

The situation in Pomerania remained disorganized. The Dukes had conflicts with the Pomeranian cities and were short of funds due to their ongoing feuds.

The relation with the neighbouring Teutonic Knights was inconsistent. In 1388, Swantibor I and Bogislaw VII served the order for a while. In 1403, however, Swantibor tried to make his son Otto II archbishop of Riga, against the will of the Order, who supported John of Wallenrode as their candidate for the position. In the Battle of Grunwald in 1410, a Pomeranian contingent led by Swantibor's son Casimir V, fought on the side of the Order. The Order lost the battle and Casimir was taken prisoner by the victorious Poles. He was, however, released soon afterwards.

In 1388, Charles IV's son Sigismund (1368–1437) enfeoffed Jobst of Moravia (1351–1411) with the Margraviate of Brandenburg. Conflicts erupted again between Brandenburg and Pomerania. In 1409, a compromise was reached between Jobst and Swantibor and Jobst enfeoffed Swantibor with the Lordship of Beeskow. Swantibor then fell into disputes with the local nobility in Beeskow, who had previously supported him against Jobst.

After Jobst died in 1411, Sigismund enfeoffed Brandenburg to Burgrave Frederick VI of Nuremberg, who later became Elector of Brandenburg as Frederick I. Swantibor initially remained on his post as governor of the Mittelmark. In 1412, however, he retired and left the business of government to his sons. Swantibor's sons soon fell into military conflicts with Frederick and Dukes Otto II and Casimir V defeated Frederick in the second Battle at the Kremmen Causeway.

Swantibor I died on 21 June 1413, while the conflict with Brandenburg was still raging. He was buried in the Cistercian monastery at Kołbacz.

The verdict of the historian Martin Wehrmann (1861–1937) was the Duke Swantibor seems to have been an energetic and capable ruler, who was unfortunately, due to the condition of his country, unable to achieve permanent results.

== Marriage and issue ==
In 1374, Swantibor I married Anna, the daughter of the Burgrave Albert the Beautiful of Nuremberg, and granddaughter of Frederick IV, Burgrave of Nuremberg. Two sons and a daughter survived him:

- Otto II (c. 1380 – 1428)
- Casimir V (after 1380 – 1434)
- Margaret, married Ulrich I, Duke of Mecklenburg-Stargard

== See also ==
- List of Pomeranian duchies and dukes

== Citations ==
=== Bibliography ===
- Urban, William L. (1999). Tannenberg and After: Lithuania, Poland, and the Teutonic Order in Search of Immortality. Lithuanian Research and Studies Center. ISBN 9780929700250.
- Klaus Conrad: Herzogliche Schwäche und städtische Macht in der zweiten Hälfte des 14. und im 15. Jahrhundert, in: Werner Buchholz (ed.): Deutsche Geschichte im Osten Europas. Pommern, Siedler Verlag, Berlin, 1999, ISBN 3-88680-272-8, p. 127-202
- Martin Wehrmann: Geschichte von Pommern. vol. 1, 2nd ed., Verlag Friedrich Andreas Perthes, Gotha, 1919, reprinted: Augsburg, 1992, ISBN 3-89350-112-6
- Martin Wehrmann (1908). "Swantibor III., Herzog von Pommern-Stettin" . Allgemeine Deutsche Biographie (in German). Vol. 54. Leipzig: Duncker & Humblot. pp. 640–641.
- Gottfried von Bülow (1887). "Otto II. (und Casimir VI.)" . Allgemeine Deutsche Biographie (in German). Vol. 25. Leipzig: Duncker & Humblot. pp. 785–787.
- E. Rymar: Rodowód książąt pomorskich, Szczecin, Pomeranian Library, 2005, ISBN 83-87879-50-9, OCLC 69296056.

Swantibor I House of Griffins Born: c. 1351 Died: 21 June 1413
Preceded by Casmir III	Duke of Pomerania-Stettin; 1372–1413	Succeeded by Casmir V
