= Pomerania-Stettin =

Former monarchy in Europe

Duchy of Pomerania-Stettin (Teil-)Herzogtum Pommern-Stettin (German) Księstwo szczecińskie (Polish) Ducatus Stetinensis (Latin)
- 1160–1264; 1295–1523; 1532–1625
- Banner (1410) Coat of arms (16th century)

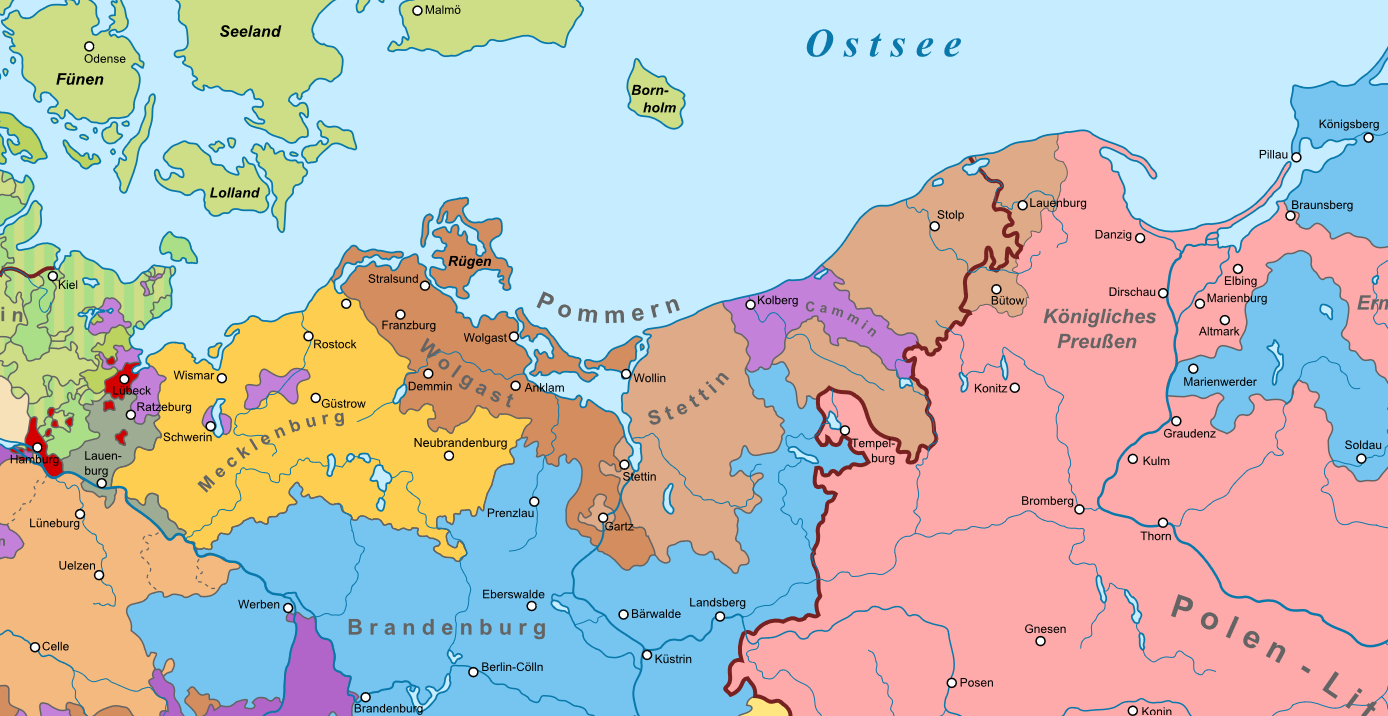
- Pomerania-Stettin in 1618.
- Status: State of the Holy Roman Empire
- Capital: Stettin (Szczecin)
- Religion: Roman Catholic
- Government: Feudal duchy
- Duke
  - 1160–1187 (first of first state): Bogusław I
  - 1220–1264 (last of first state): Barnim I
  - 1295–1344 (first of second state): Otto I
  - 1478–1478 (last of second state): Bogislaw X
  - 1531–1569 (first of third state): Barnim XI
  - 1620–1625 (last of third state): Bogislaw XIV
- Historical era: High Middle Ages; Late Middle Ages; Early modern period
  - Partition of the Duchy of Pomerania: 1160
  - Unification of the Duchy of Pomerania: 1264
  - Partition of the Duchy of Pomerania: 1295
  - Unification of the Duchy of Pomerania: 1523
  - Partition of the Duchy of Pomerania: 21 October 1532
  - Unification of the Duchy of Pomerania: 1625
Preceded by
Duchy of Pomerania
Succeeded by
Duchy of Pomerania
Pomerania-Demmin
Pomerania-Schlawe
Pomerania-Rügenwalde
- Today part of: Poland; Germany

The Duchy of Pomerania-Stettin, (Note: German: (Teil-)Herzogtum Pommern-Stettin) also known as the Duchy of Stettin, and the Duchy of Szczecin, (Note: Polish: Księstwo szczecińskie; Latin: Ducatus Stetinensis) was a feudal duchy in Farther Pomerania within the Holy Roman Empire. Its capital was Stettin (Szczecin). It was ruled by the Griffin dynasty. It existed in the eras of the High and Late Middle Ages, and the early modern period, between 1160 and 1264, between 1295 and 1523, and between 1532 and 1625.

The state was formed in 1160, in the partition of the Duchy of Pomerania, with duke Bogusław I, as its first ruler. In 1264, Barnim I, Duke of Stettin, had unified duchies of Pomerania-Stettin and Pomerania-Demmin, re-establishing the Duchy of Pomerania. The state was again formed in 1295, in the partition of the Duchy of Pomerania, with Otto I as its ruler. In 1478, the state was incorporated into the re-unified Duchy of Pomerania, under the rule of duke Bogislaw X. Pomerania-Stettin was again established in 21 October 1532, with the partition of Duchy of Pomerania, with Barnim XI as its ruler. The state existed until 1625, when, under the rule of Bogislaw XIV, it was incorporated into the unified Duchy of Pomerania.

== List of leaders ==
=== First state ===
- Bogusław I (1160–1187)
- Bogislaw II and Casimir II (1187–1202)
- Bogislaw II (1202–1220)
- Barnim I (1220–1264)

=== Second state ===
- Otto I (1295–1344)
- Barnim III (1344–1368)
- Casimir III (1368–1372)
- Swantibor I and Bogislaw VII (1372–1404)
- Swantibor I (1404–1413)
- Otto II and Casimir V (1413–1428)
- Casimir V (1428–1435)
- Joachim (1435–1451)
- Otto III (1451–1464)
- Eric II (1464–1474)
- Bogislaw X (1474–1478)

=== Third state ===
- Barnim XI (1531–1569)
- John Frederick (1569–1600)
- Barnim X (1600–1603)
- Bogislaw XIII (1603–1606)
- Philip II (1606–1618)
- Francis (1618–1620)
- Bogislaw XIV (1620–1625)

== Citations ==
=== Bibliography ===
- B. Dopierała, Polskie losy Pomorza Zachodniego
- Jan Maria Piskorski, Pommern im Wandel der Zeiten, Szczecin, Ducal Castle, 1999, ISBN 8390618486.
- E. Rymar, Rodowód książąt pomorskich, Szczecin, Pomeranian Library, 2005, ISBN 83-87879-50-9, OCLC 69296056.
- K. Kozłowski, J. Podralski, Gryfici. Książęta Pomorza Zachodniego, Szczecin, Krajowa Agencja Wydawnicza, 1985, ISBN 83-03-00530-8, OCLC 189424372.
- J. W. Szymański, Książęcy ród Gryfitów, Goleniów–Kielce 2006, ISBN 83-7273-224-8.
