= Vierraden =

Coordinates: 53°06′N 14°18′E

Coat of arms

Vierraden was the name of a small town in the northeast of the German state of Brandenburg.

On October 26, 2003, it was incorporated into the city of Schwedt (Oder), which is about 3 kilometers to the south. Until the incorporation, Vierraden was part of the municipality of Gartz (Oder).

== Overview ==
The town is near the mouth of the river Welse into the Hohensaaten-Friedrichsthaler Canal, which runs parallel to the River Oder. The Lower Oder Valley National Park begins just east of Vierraden.

The "Mill with Four Wheels" (the name Vierraden means "four wheels") was first mentioned in 1265 in a document. The castle on the north bank of the Welse can be found in a document from 1321. Vierraden was given town privileges in 1515. It was almost completely destroyed during World War II because of its strategic location near the Oder river.

Vierraden is known for growing tobacco, the area of the Eastern Uckermark is one of the few places in Germany to do so. The plants were brought to the area by Huguenots. There is a Tobacco Museum in Vierraden.

== Towns near Vierraden ==
- Schwedt (Germany)
- Gartz (Germany)
- Penkun (Germany)
- Szczecin City (Poland)
- Gryfino (Poland)
- Cedynia (Poland)
- Chojna (Poland)
- Mieszkowice (Poland)
- Moryń (Poland)
- Trzcińsko-Zdrój (Poland)
- Myślibórz (Poland)
- Pyrzyce (Poland)
