= Casimir III of Pomerania =

Casimir III, Duke of Pomerania
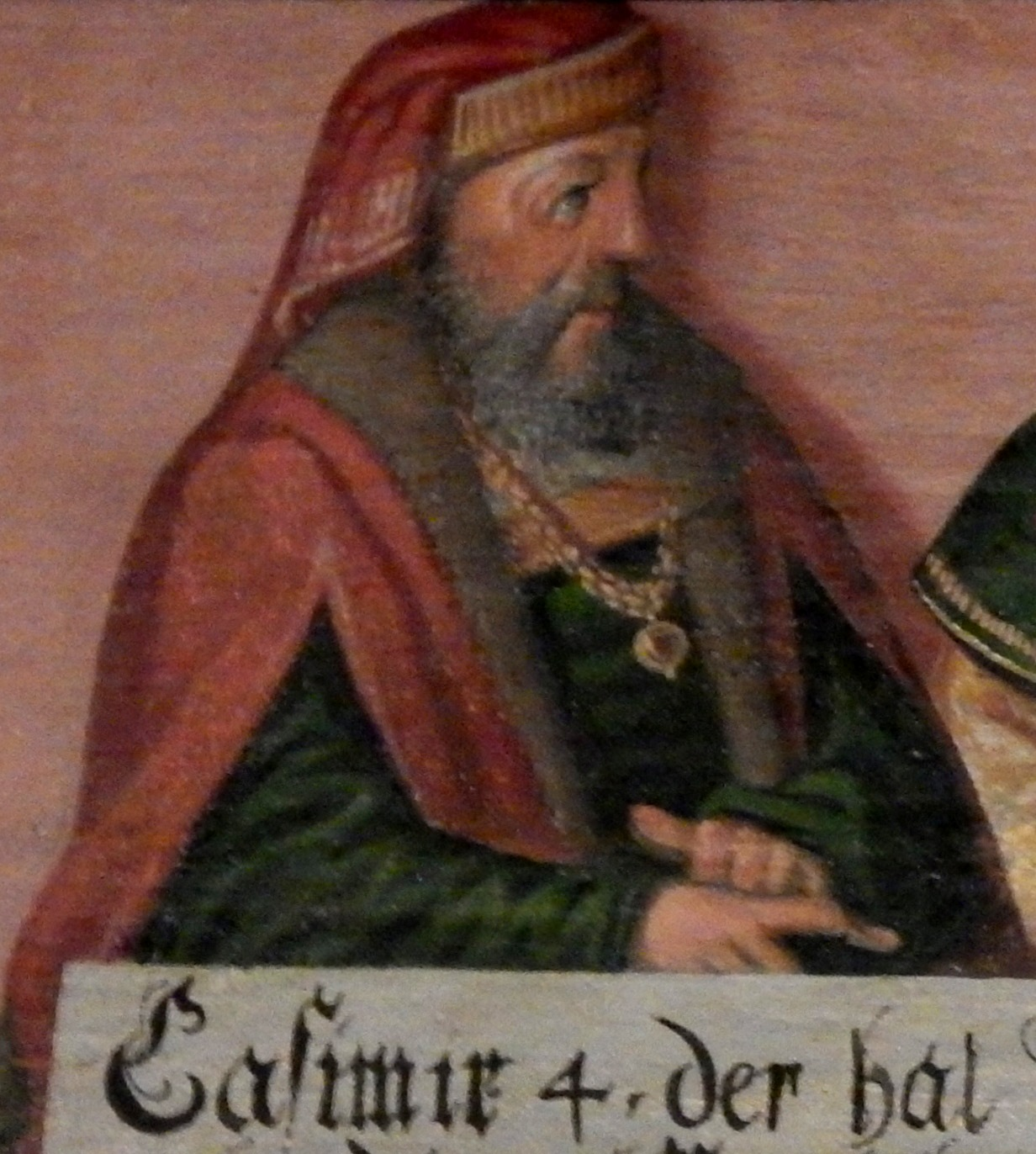
- Born: 1348
- Died: 24 August 1372; Königsberg (Neumark)
- Noble family: House of Griffin
- Father: Barnim III, Duke of Pomerania
- Mother: Agnes of Brunswick-Grubenhagen

Casimir or Kasimir III (IV) (1348 – 24 August 1372), oldest son of Barnim III, was one of the Dukes of Pomerania-Stettin (Szczecin). He died during a campaign against the Margraviate of Brandenburg during the siege of Königsberg (Neumark) in 1372.

== See also ==
- List of Pomeranian duchies and dukes
- History of Pomerania
- Duchy of Pomerania
- House of Pomerania

== Ancestors ==
Ancestors of Casimir III of Pomerania

16. Bogislaw II, Duke of Pomerania
8. Barnim I, Duke of Pomerania
17. Miroslawa of Pomerelia
4. Otto I, Duke of Pomerania
18. Otto III, Margrave of Brandenburg
9. Matilda of Brandenburg-Salzwedel
19. Beatrice of Bohemia
2. Barnim III, Duke of Pomerania
20. Gerhard I, Count of Holstein-Itzehoe
10. Gerhard II, Count of Holstein-Plön
21. Elisabeth of Mecklenburg
5. Elisabeth of Holstein
22. Valdemar, King of Sweden
11. Ingeborg of Sweden
23. Sofia of Denmark
1. Casimir III, Duke of Pomerania
24. Albert I, Duke of Brunswick-Lüneburg
12. Henry I, Duke of Brunswick-Grubenhagen
25. Adelaide of Montferrat
6. Henry II, Duke of Brunswick-Lüneburg
26. Albert II, Margrave of Meissen
13. Agnes of Meissen
27. Margaret of Sicily
3. Agnes of Brunswick-Grubenhagen
28. John I, Margrave of Brandenburg
14. Henry I, Margrave of Brandenburg-Stendal
29. Jutta of Saxony
7. Judith of Brandenburg-Stendal
30. Louis II, Duke of Bavaria
15. Agnes of Bavaria
31. Matilda of Habsburg

Casimir III of Pomerania House of Griffins Born: 1348 Died: 24 August 1372
Preceded by Barnim III	Duke of Pomerania-Stettin; 1368–1372	Succeeded by Swantibor III
