= Barnim III =

Duke of Pomerania-Stettin (r. 1344–1368)

Barnim III the Great
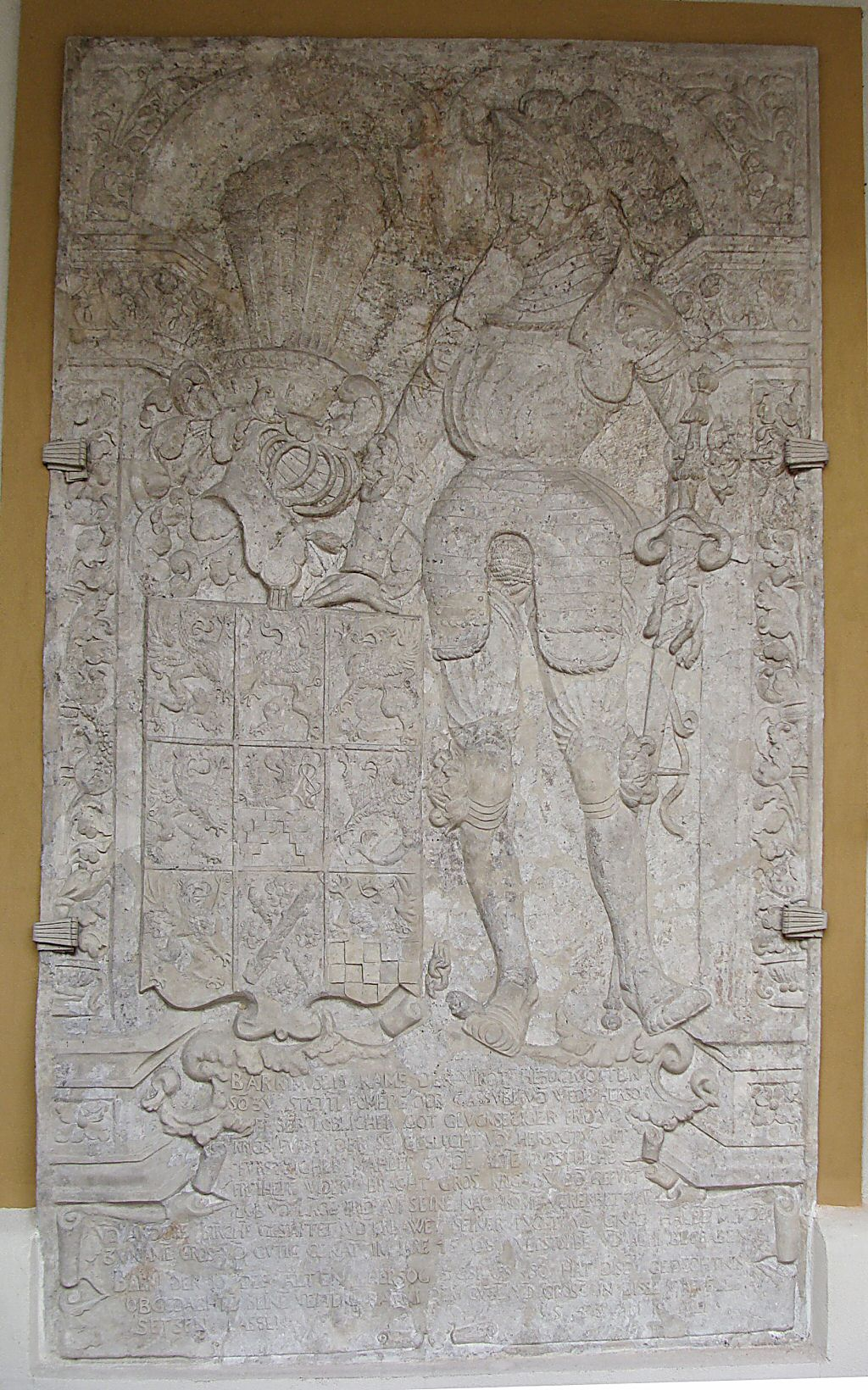
- Barnim III's tomb, Pomeranian Dukes' Castle, Szczecin (Stettin)
- Born: c. 1300
- Died: 14 August 1368
- Noble family: House of Griffin
- Spouse: Agnes of Brunswick-Grubenhagen
- Issue: Casimir III; Swantibor III; Bogislaw VII
- Father: Otto I, Duke of Pomerania
- Mother: Elisabeth of Holstein

Barnim III the Great (c. 1300 – 14 August 1368) was a Pomeranian duke from the House of Griffin.

== Life ==
He ruled Pomerania-Stettin in the years 1344–1368, although he had been a co-regent of his father Otto I since 1320, taking a prominent part in the defence and government of the duchy. Aiming for independence from the Margraviate of Brandenburg, he allied himself with Poland and Bohemia. In 1338, Brandenburg relinquished supremacy over Pomerania, and in 1348 Charles IV recognized the duchy as a fiefdom of the Holy Roman Empire, which helped to protect it from the Brandenburg margraves. The civil war in Brandenburg in the years 1349–1354 allowed Barnim III to extend his duchy by conquest. He was first dux Cassuborum Duke of Kashubians.

== Marriage and issue ==
Barnim III married Agnes (c. 1318 – before or in 1371), a daughter of Duke Henry II of Brunswick-Grubenhagen. They had four children:

- Otto (d. 1337)
- Casimir III (1348 – 24 August 1372)
- Swantibor III (c. 1351 – 21 June 1413)
- Bogislaw VII (before 1366 – 1404)

== Ancestry ==
Ancestors of Barnim III

8. Bogislaw II, Duke of Pomerania
4. Barnim I, Duke of Pomerania
9. Miroslawa of Pomerelia
2. Otto I, Duke of Pomerania
10. Otto III, Margrave of Brandenburg
5. Matilda of Brandenburg-Salzwedel
11. Beatrice of Bohemia
1. Barnim III, Duke of Pomerania
12. Gerhard I, Count of Holstein-Itzehoe
6. Gerhard II, Count of Holstein-Plön
13. Elisabeth of Mecklenburg
3. Elisabeth of Holstein
14. Valdemar, King of Sweden
7. Ingeborg of Sweden
15. Sofia of Denmark

== See also ==
- List of Pomeranian duchies and dukes
- History of Pomerania
- Duchy of Pomerania
- House of Pomerania

Barnim III House of Griffins Born: c. 1303 Died: 24 August 1368
Preceded by Otto I	Duke of Pomerania-Stettin; 1344–1368	Succeeded by Casimir III
