= Casimir V of Pomerania =

Casimir V, Duke of Pomerania
- Born: after 1380
- Died: 13 April 1435
- Buried: Szczecin
- Noble family: House of Griffin
- Spouses: Catherine of Brunswick-Lüneburg; Elisabeth of Brunswick-Grubenhagen
- Father: Swantibor III, Duke of Pomerania
- Mother: Anna of Nuremberg

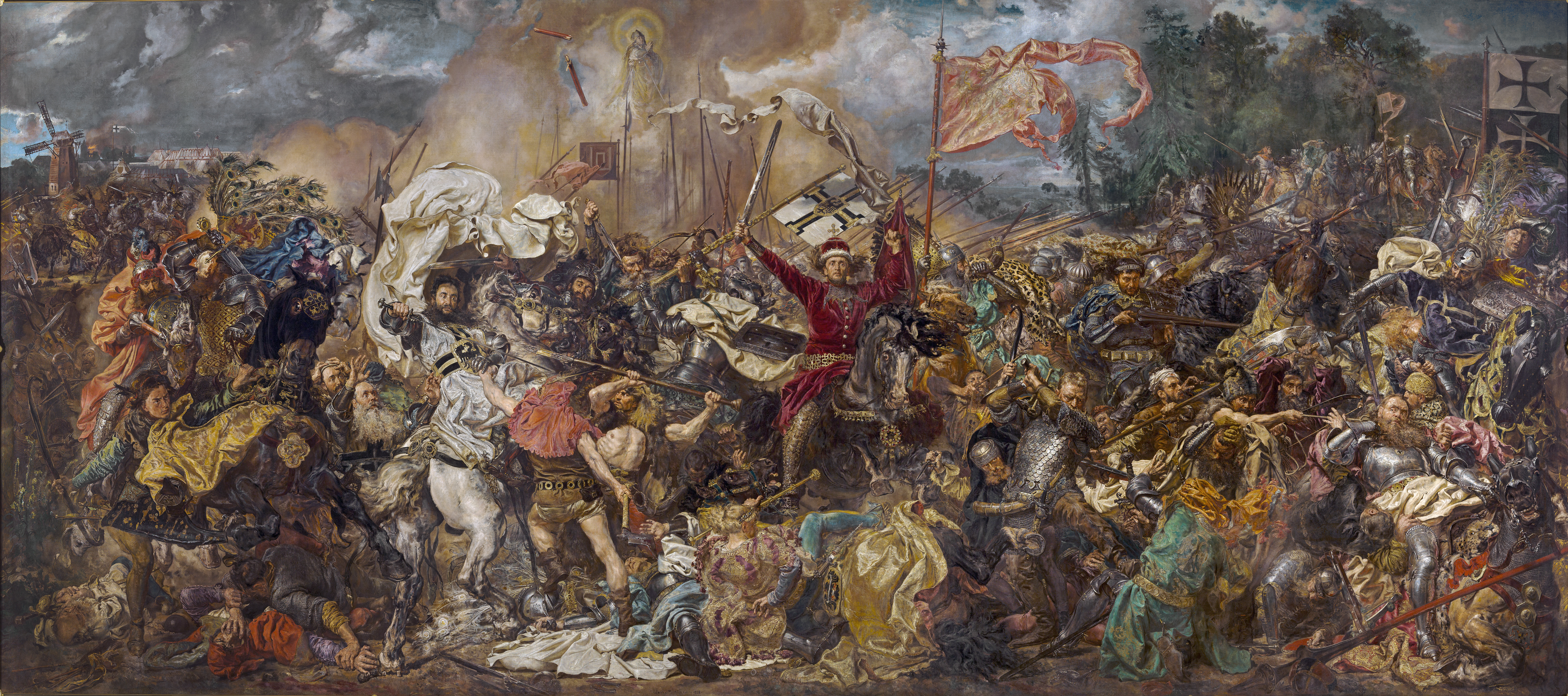
Jan Matejko, Battle of Grunwald.jpg

Duke Casimir V of Pomerania (or, counting differently, Casimir VI; after 1380 – 13 April 1435) was a member of the House of Griffins and a Duke of Pomerania. He ruled in Pomerania-Stettin together with his brother Otto II from 1413 to 1428. After 1428, he ruled Pomerania-Stettin alone.

== Life ==
Casimir V was the youngest son of Duke Swantibor III of (1351–1413), who ruled Pomerania-Stettin alone. His older brothers were Otto II (born: c. 1380 – died 1428) and Albert (died before 1412).

His father made him leader of the Pomeranian contingent who took part in the Battle of Tannenberg (1410) on the side of the Teutonic Order. The battle was won by the Polish, who took Casimir prisoner. He was released soon afterwards. In the Battle of Kremmer Damm (1412), Casimir and his older brother Otto II fought against Brandenburg.

After Duke Swantibors's death in 1413, Casimir and his older brother Otto II jointly ruled Pomerania-Stettin. The war with Brandenburg continued. In 1415, Elector Frederick I of Brandenburg convinced King Sigismund to outlaw Otto II and Casimir V. He also called the imperial immediacy of Pomerania in question. In 1417, Sigismund enfeoffed Otto and Casimir, but this was conditional on any rights Brandenburg might have on Pomerania. In 1424, Casimir visited Sigismund in Buda in Hungary. Otto and Casimir were then enfeoffed unconditionally.

After Otto II died childless in 1428, Casimir ruled Pomerania-Stettin alone. He suppressed a revolt in the city of Szczecin. He ordered the execution of the ringleaders, the city had to pay a steep fine and resign from the Hanseatic League.

Casimir V died in 1435 and was buried in the Otten Church in Stettin. His son Joachim the Younger succeeded him as ruler of Pomerania-Stettin.

== Marriage and issue ==
Duke Casimir V. was married twice. His first wife was Catherine, the daughter of Duke Bernard I of Brunswick-Lüneburg. From this marriage, he had three children:

- Joachim the Elder (died before 1424)
- Joachim the Younger (born after 1424 – died in 1451); married Elisabeth of Brandenburg, Duchess of Pomerania, and had a son, Otto III, Duke of Pomerania
- Anna (died after 1447), married John V of Mecklenburg-Schwerin

After Catherine's death he married Elisabeth, a daughter of Duke Eric I of Brunswick-Grubenhagen. From this marriage, he had a daughter:

- Margaret (born: c. 1439), married count Albert III of Lindow-Ruppin

After Duke Casimir's death, his widow Elisabeth became Abbess of Gandersheim.

== Numeral ==
The counting of the rulers of the House of Griffins has always been complicated. From time immemorial there exists an imbalance, which causes some confusion. The modern numbering counts only the members of the main line of the House of Griffins. Under that system, the subject of this article is Casimir V. If one also takes into account cadet branch of the Swantiborides, which was common in the older literature, he would be Casimir VI.

== See also ==
- House of Griffin
- List of Pomeranian duchies and dukes

== References and sources ==
- Gottfried von Bülow (1887). "Otto II. und Casimir VI." . Allgemeine Deutsche Biographie (in German). Vol. 25. Leipzig: Duncker & Humblot. pp. 785–787.
- Martin Wehrmann: Genealogie des pommerschen Herzogshauses. Verlag Leon Sauniers Buchhandlung, Stettin 1937, pp. 70–71.
- Martin Wehrmann: Geschichte von Pommern. vol 2, second edition, Verlag Friedrich Andreas Perthes, Gotha 1921. (reprinted: Augsburg, 1992, ISBN 3-89350-112-6)

== Footnotes ==
Casimir V of Pomerania House of Griffins Born: after 1380 Died: 13 April 1435
Preceded by Swantibor III	Duke of Pomerania-Stettin; 1413–1435	Succeeded by Joachim I
