= Coat of arms of Pomerania =

The coat of arms of Pomerania.

The coat of arms of Pomerania, also known as the Pomeranian Griffin, (Note: German: Pommerscher Greif; Polish: gryf pomorski; Kashubian: pòmòrsczi grif) is the symbol of Pomerania, a historical region on the southern shore of the Baltic Sea in Central Europe, split between Poland and Germany. It depicts a red griffin with yellow (golden) beak and claws, placed within a white (silver) shield. It originates from the late 12th century.

== History ==
=== Pomeranian duchies ===
The coat of arms depicting a fleur-de-lis, used as the symbol of the House of Griffin in the 12th century, and the House of Samboride in the 12th and 13th centuries.

In the 12th century, the House of Griffin, which ruled the Duchy of Pomerania, and letter Pomerania-Stettin and Pomerania-Demmin, as well as the House of Samboride, which ruled the Duchy of Eastern Pomerania, used the fleur-de-lis, a lily, as their symbol.

The coat of arms of Pomerania in 13th century.

The coat of arms of Pomerania-Stettin, and later the entire Pomerania, used from 13th to 16th centuries.

The oldest known reference to the use of the griffin as a heraldic symbol in Western Pomerania comes from a document that can be dated between 1191 and 1194. It was a deed of donation from duchess Anastasia of Greater Poland and her sons, Bogislaw II and Casimir II, rulers of the Duchy of Pomerania, to a church in Budzistowo. The original document does not survive, however, a 1384 copy contains a description of the attached seals. It includes an equestrian seal, depicting a cavalryman sitting on a jumping horse, facing right, and holding a flag and a shield. The griffin was present on the shield. An older known seal of duke Bogusław I, does not contain a griffin. Until 1219, the griffin was also present in the seals of the members of the House of Mecklenburg, which ruled the nearby Lordship of Mecklenburg.

Alternative version of the coat of arms of Pomerania-Wologast, used in 13th century.

Coat of arms of Pomerania-Stargard used from 13th to 15th centuries.

Since then, a griffin had become the symbol used by the dukes from the House of Griffin, which ruled the Duchy of Pomerania. By the end of 14th century, the red griffin on a white shield was used to represent the entire region of Pomerania under the rule of Griffin dynasty. At least since the rule of duke Swantibor I, which lasted from 1372 to 1413, Pomerania-Stettin used the red griffin with yellow (golden) beak and claws. In 1410, during the Battle of Grunwald, the forces of Pomerania-Stettin led by duke Casimir V, flue a white banner with a red griffin on it. Since 1325, the Duchy of Pomerania-Wolgast used a black griffin in a yellow (golden) shield as its symbol. The version with a red griffin in a yellow (golden) shield was also used. The coat of arms of Pomerania-Stargard depicted a yellow (golden) griffin in the blue shield.

While the Griffin dynasty, since 13th century, was using the griffin as its symbol, the Samboride dynasty continued using fleur-de-lis as its symbol until the end of the century. In 1251, Samboride duke Sambor II, ruler of the Duchy of Lubiszewo, began using a griffin in his seals. It was adopted from the symbols used by the House of Mecklenburg, from which came his wife, Matilda. From the 1270s to 1294, Samboride duke Mestwin II, ruler of the Duchy of Eastern Pomerania, began using the coat of arms depicting a lion and an eagle in an attempt to strengthen political ties with the Duchy of Greater Poland, which used said symbols.

As dukes of the Griffin dynasty ruled in the concurrent estate, they hold their titles together. By the end of the 14th century, they have begun using the title "Duke of Stettin, Pomerania, Wends (or Slavs), and Kashubia". The titles were represented by the four coats of arms used by the dukes. They were originally presented separately, for example in the seal of duke Otto I, however, later they began being combined into a single symbol. At the time is wasn't specified to which territories the tiled exactly referred.

The coat of arms of the Dukes of Wends and the Dukes of Slavs of the House of Griffin, used from 14th to 16th century.

The titles Duke of Wends and Duke of Slavs were used alternately by the dukes. Duke of Wends most likely referred to the area between rivers Tollense and Peene, which was originally settled by the tribe of Lutizen and conquered by Pomerania in the 12th century, and sometimes also referred to as the Duchy or Lordship of Groswin. It is theorized that the title Duke of Slavs originally referred to the region of Kashubia. By the 16th century, both titles were represented by the red griffin in green stripes placed on a white background. Gelre Armorial, an armorial dated to be made before 1396, includes the coat of arms of Groswin, which depicted a red griffin with green stripes placed in a yellow (golden) shield. The title of the Duke of Kashubia, was used from the 13th century. The region of Kashubia, is now being defined as located in Pomerelia, in what is now Pomeranian Voivodeship, Poland, however, it remains unknown what area exactly it referred to at the time.

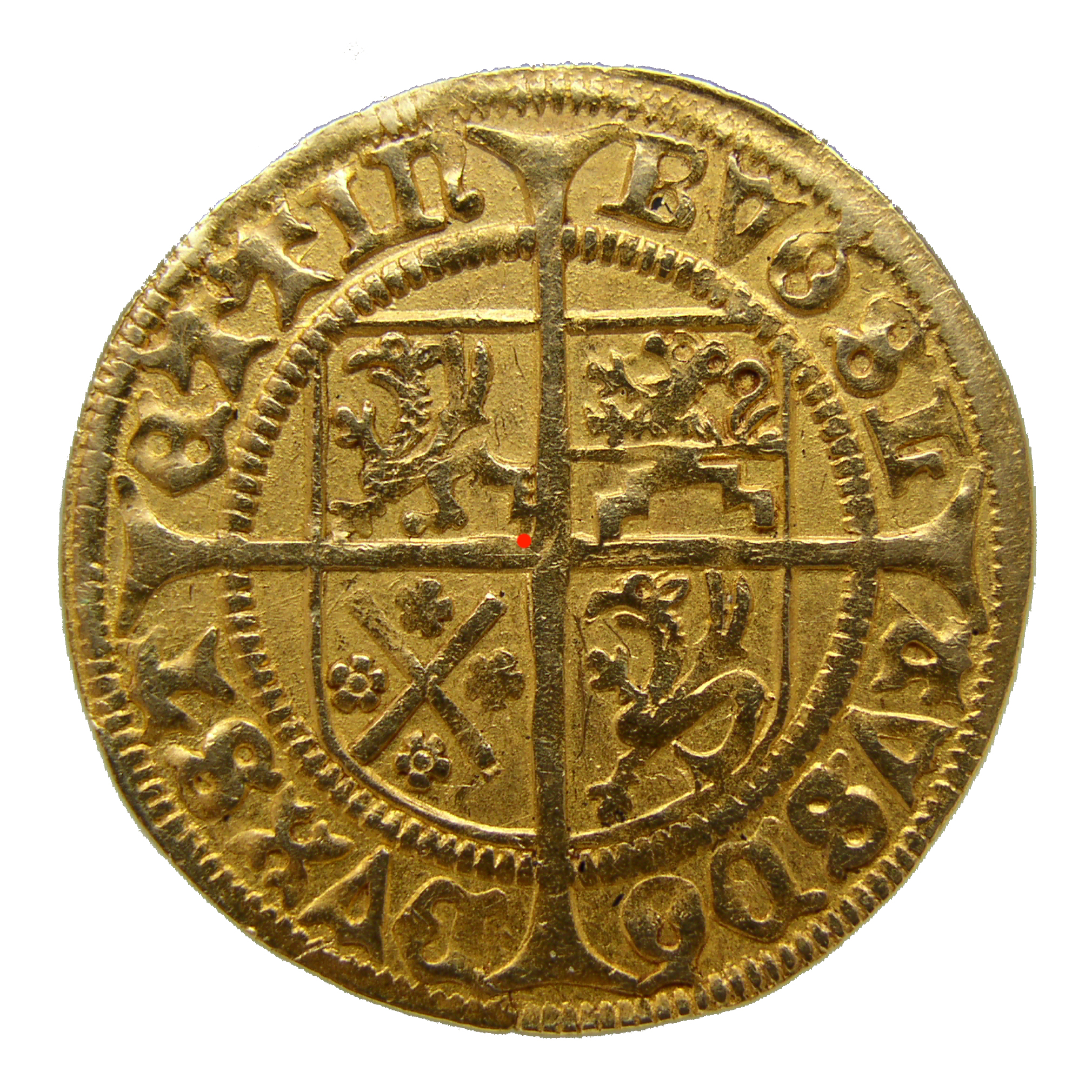
A guilder coin, depicting the coat of arms of the Duchy of Pomerania, minted between 1498 or 1499, during the reign of duke Bogislaw X.

In the second half of the 15th century, a black griffin in the yellow (golden) shield, previously associated with Pomerania-Wologast, began being used as the symbol of Pomerania-Barth. As such, Pomerania-Wologast began using a coat of arms divided horizontally into two parts, with the top part depicting a top half of a white (silver) griffin on a red background, and the bottom part depicting a checkered pattern of yellow (golden) and blue rectangles. Prior to that, it was the symbol of Bernstein Land, before it was incorporated into the Margraviate of Brandenburg in 1478.

In the second half of the 15th century, duke Eric II introduced the first complex coat of arms, combining four coats of arms into one. In accordance to the descriptions from the 1469 documents, the coat of arms consisted of the shield divided into four fields, from top left to bottom right, depicted:

- a red griffin with a yellow (golden) beak and claws in a white (silver) field, representing the Pomerania-Stettin and the entire region of Pomerania;
- a black griffin in a yellow (golden) field, representing Pomerania-Barth,
- a red griffin with green diagonal stripes in a yellow (golden) field, representing the Wendish lands;
- a field divided horizontally into two parts, with the top part depicting a top half of a white (silver) griffin on a red background, and the bottom part depicting a checkered pattern of yellow (golden) and blue rectangles, representing the Pomerania-Wologast.

In the middle of the shield was placed a smaller shield, that was divided into two horizontal fields. The top field depicted a black lion wearing a red crown, placed on a yellow (golden) background. The top field depicted the top half of a black lion wearing a red crown, placed on a yellow (golden) background. The bottom field consisted of a checkered pattern consisting of red and blue rectangles, with the red rectangles forming a shape of an up-facing triangle. It was the coat of arms of the Principality of Rügen. The lion was most likely established as the symbol of the principality by the King of Denmark, who became its suzerain in 1168. The older coat of arms of the region depicted a griffin.

The coat of arms was used on the coins. Its design was continued by Eric's successors, though it was subsequently modified, and the order of the coat of arms was not always the same within the shield. Duke Bogislaw X had replaced the Rügen coat of arms placed in the centre, with the coat of arms of Pomerania-Stettin, depicting the red griffin with yellow (golden) claws and beak, on a white background, to represent the ancestral home of the Griffin dynasty. The design also included the coat of arms of the County of Gützkow, which depicted two diagonally-crossed red bars, and four red roses with yellow (golden) centres and green sepals, placed around them. They were placed on a yellow (golden) background. The coat of arms was designed by count Jaczo of Salzwedel in 12th century. Sometimes, it also included the red field with a white sea-griffin, a griffin with a fishtail. The symbol originates from the region of Lands of Schlawe and Stolp. It was originally used in the coat of arms of the Swienca family, which hold powerful offices in the area from 13th to 14th centuries. Following them dying out in around 1316, the area went back under the direct rule of the House of Griffin, which continued to use the sea-griffin in the regional coat of arms. However, in the contemporary coat of arms, it was used to represent the island of Usedom instead.

At the beginning of the 16th century, on the head of the red griffin on a white background, representing Pomerania-Stettin, was added the crown. Its design was most likely borrowed from the coat of arms of the city of Stettin (now Szczecin, Poland), which was the ducal residence since at least 1464. The crown was confirmed in the 1521 Imperial Coat of Arms Privilege. Bogislaw X also changed the colour of the background of said field, from white (silver) to yellow (gold). It was later returned to the white (silver) color, however, the yellow (golden) color remained the colour of the royal court.

In the private coat of arms of duke George I was included the helmet above the shield, with a crown hat with a small plume of peacock feathers. Such design had been since then incorporated into the other coat of arms of Pomerania.

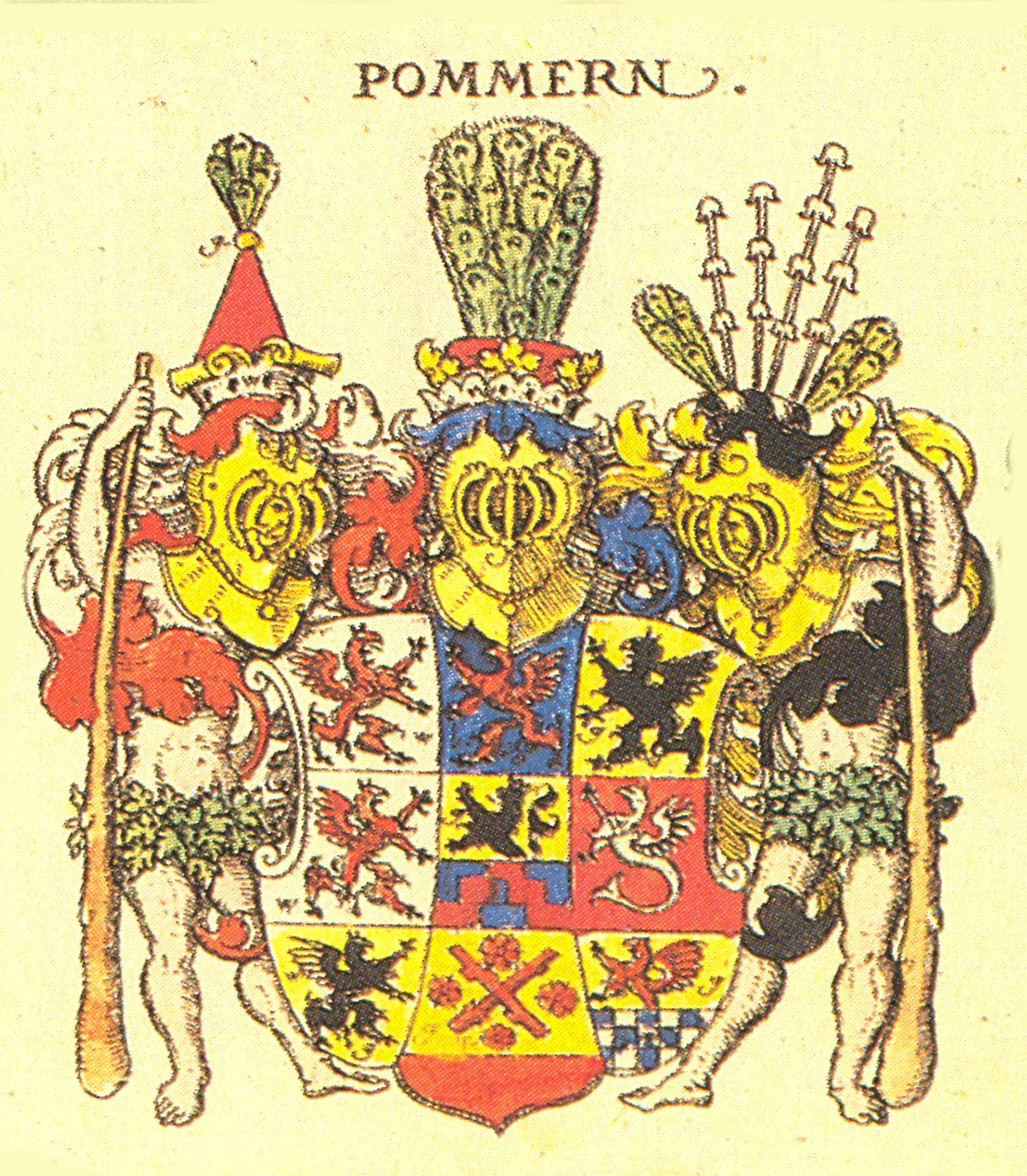
The coat of arms of the Duchy of Pomerania depicted in the illustration from 1605 by Johann Siebmacher.

In the final years of Bogislaw X's reign, the coat of arms with nine fields had been introduced. Despite it, it began being popularly used after his death, during the reign of dukes George I, and Barnim XI, who were crowned in 1523. One of oldest known appearances of the symbol is the 1524 document confirming the town privileges of Greifswald. The oldest known depiction of the coat of arms with the authentic colours is contained within Croÿ-Teppich, a tapestry made in 1554 by Peter Heymans. Another notable surviving depiction of the coat of arms is the sculpture at the wall of the Pudagla Manor House in Pudagla, Germany.

The coat of arms consisted of nine fields within a single Escutcheon (shield), divided into three rows, each containing three fields. In the top row, the left field, from the viewer's point of view, contained a red right-facing griffin with a yellow (golden) beak and claws, and a yellow (golden) crown on its head, placed on a blue background. It symbolized Pomerania-Stettin. The middle field depicted a red left-facing griffin with beak and claws, placed on a white background. It symbolized the Duchy of Pomerania. The right field depicted a black left-facing griffin placed on a yellow (golden) background. It symbolized Lauenburg and Bütow Land, which was represented within the titles of the Griffin dynasty by the title Duke of Kashubia. Prior to this, said coat of arms was associated with Pomerania-Barth, and earlier, with Pomerania-Wolgast. In the middle row, the left field depicted a red right-facing griffin with green diagonal stripes placed on a white background, representing the Wendish lands. The middle field was divided horizontally into two parts. The top part depicted a top half of a black lion wearing a red crown, placed on a yellow (golden) background. The bottom field consisted of a checkered pattern consisting of red and blue rectangles, with the red rectangles forming a shape of an up-facing triangle. It symbolized the Principality of Rügen. The right field depicted a white left-facing sea-griffin, a griffin with a fishtail. It symbolized the island of Usedom. In the bottom row, the left field depicted a right-facing black griffin with two white (silver) feathers on its wings, close to its torso. It was placed on a yellow (golden) background and symbolized Pomerania-Barth. Prior to this, said the area was represented by a black griffin on a yellow (golden) background, identical to the previous coat of arms of Pomerania-Wologast, and the contemporary coat of arms representing the title of Duke of Kashubia. To distinguish it from the latter, the white (silver) feathers were added. The middle field depicted two diagonally-crossed red bars, and four red roses with yellow (golden) centres and green sepals, placed around them. They were placed on a yellow (golden) background. It symbolized the County of Gützkow. The right field was divided horizontally into two parts, with the top part depicting a top half of a left-facing white (silver) griffin on a red background, and the bottom part depicting a checkered pattern of yellow (golden) and blue rectangles. It represented Pomerania-Wologast.

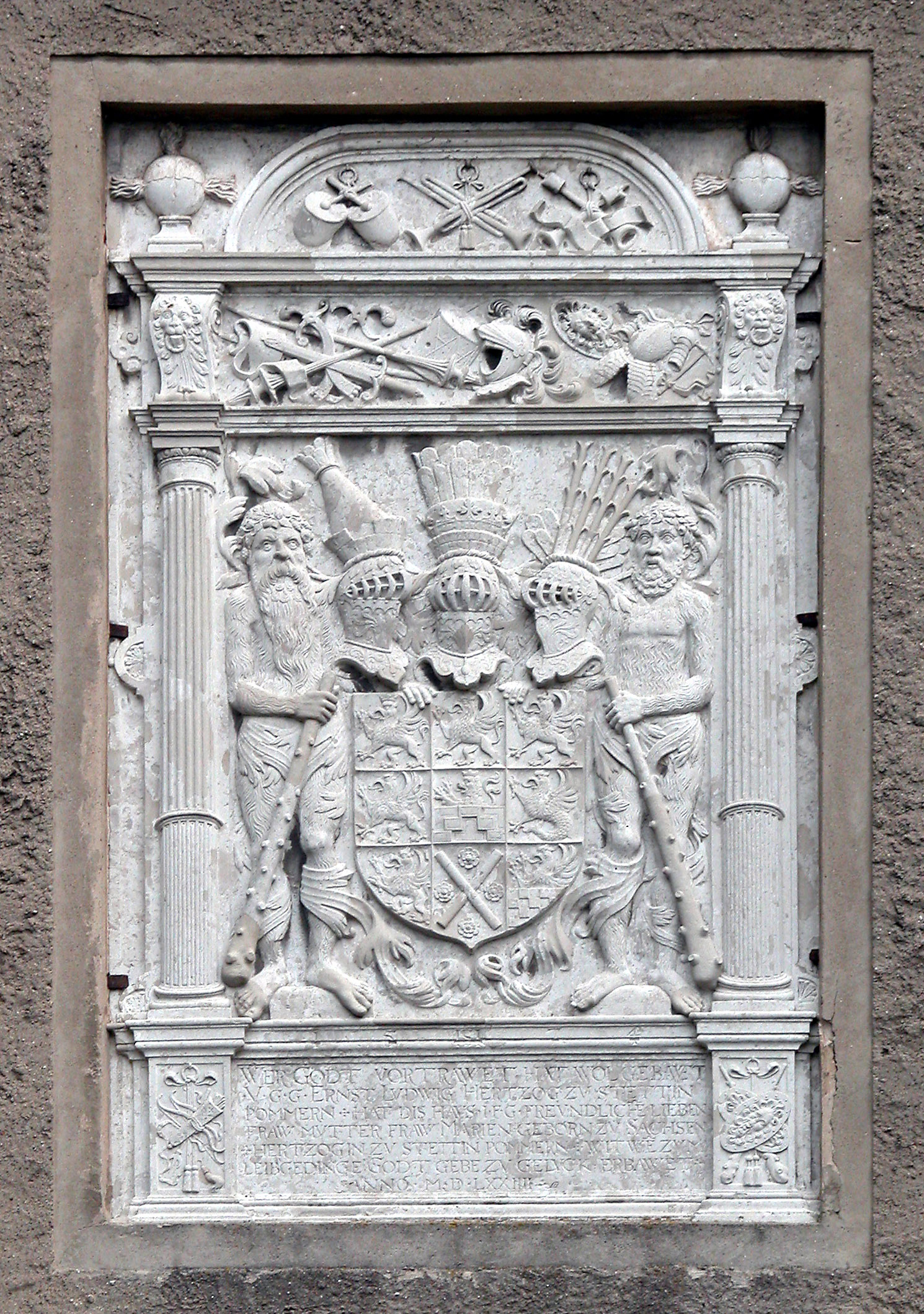
The coat of arms of the Duchy of Pomerania, depicted in the façade sculpture of the Pudagla Manor House in Pudagla, Germany.

Above the shield, were placed three helmet. Above the top left field was placed a helmet with a ducal crown and a flat hat made out of a spiked top, made out of the ermine fur, with a large plume of peacock feathers on top, which represented the Principality of Rügen. The mantling, a drapery tied to the helmet, was black and yellow (golden). Above the top middle field was placed a helmet with a crown and a pointed hat with a small plume of peacock feathers, which represented the Pomerania-Stettin. The mantling of the helmet was red and blue. Above the top right field was placed a helmet with a crown and hat with a lily stems and a small plume of peacock feathers, which represented Pomerania. The mantling of the helmet was red and white (silver). On the sides of the shield were the supporters, in the form of creatures holding it. Originally they were a griffin and a lion. Not long after they were replaced by two wild men, figures depicting male humans wearing oak leaves around their hips, and holding clubs.

In 1569, at the bottom of the shield was added the 10th, empty, red field, which symbolized the high justice of the Griffin dynasty. In German, it was referred to as Blutgerichtsbarkeit, which meant blood jurisdiction, hence the red colour, similar to the colour of blood. It was not always in the coat of arms. During the reign of duke Bogislaw XIV, which lasted from 1625 to 1637, a white (silver) cross pattée was added to the coat of arms, being placed in a red field, below the top middle field. It symbolized the Bishopric of Cammin.

Some coins of Pomerania-Stettin, minted during the reign of dukes Philip II, and later Bogislaw XIV, depicted a griffin with a crown on its head, holding a sword in its right hand, and in most versions, had its left hand put on an open book.

The Griffin dynasty had died out with the death of duke Bogislaw XIV in 1637. As such, the Duchy of Pomerania ceased to exist, with its lands being partitioned between the Margraviate of Brandenburg and Swedish Pomerania. Following that, the fields of the coat of arms, helmets, and supporters were also adopted into the coat of arms of Brandenburg, while the supporters themselves were also added to the coat of arms of Prussia.

=== Kingdom of Poland ===
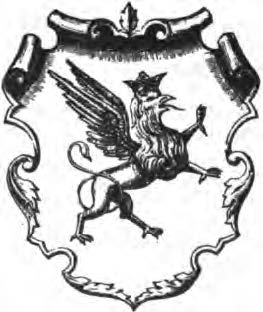
The coat of arms of the Pomeranian Voivodeship of the Kingdom of Poland, used from 1466 to 1772.

The voivodeships of Chełmno, Malbork, and Pomerania, as well as Royal Prussia, in the Kingdom of Poland, were established in a 1454 order of king Casimir IV Jagiellon. They began functioning in 1466, following the signing of the Second Peace of Thorn. The king had also established their coat of arms.

In accordance to 16th-century historian Bartosz Paprocki, its coat of arms depicted a red griffin with a crown on its head, standing on its back feat and with risen wings, placed in a white (silver) shield. However, according to 15th century historian Marcin Bielski, the coat of arms depicted a black griffin without a crown, instead.

The coat of arms of voivodeships of Chełmno, and Malbork, as well as the Royal Prussia, in the Kingdom of Poland used from 1466 to 1772, in the version with black eagle on a white background.

The coat of arms of voivodeships of Chełmno, and Malbork, as well as the Royal Prussia, in the Kingdom of Poland used from 1466 to 1772, in the version with white eagle on a red background.

There were two known versions of the coat of arms, that served as the symbol of the voivodeships of Chełmno, and Malbork, and the province of Royal Prussia. One depicted a black eagle, with a golden (yellow) crown on its neck, from which reaches an arm in silver armour, holding a sword above the head of the bird, turned to the viewer's left. It is placed on a white (silver) background. Another version depicted a white eagle, with a golden (yellow) crown on its neck, from which reaches an arm in silver armour, holding a sword above the head of the bird, turned to the viewer's left. It is placed on a red background.

Royal Prussia ceased to exist in 1569. The voivodeships of Malbork and Pomerania ceased to exist in 1772, during the First Partition of Poland, while the Chełmno Voivodeship, in 1793, during the Second Partition of Poland.

=== Swedish Pomerania ===
The coat of arms of the Swedish Pomerania during the reign of Charles X Gustav of Sweden, as depicted in his funeral banner.

Following the incorporation of the territories of the Duchy of Pomerania in 1637, into the Swedish Pomerania, it continued using its coat of arms. On its coinage it depicted the nine-field coat of arms of Pomerania, as well as a single left-facing griffin with a crown on its head, and a sword in its right hand, standing on its back feat and with risen wings. The banner made for the funeral of king Charles X Gustav of Sweden, depicted a red left-facing griffin in a yellow (golden) shield.

=== Province of Pomerania ===
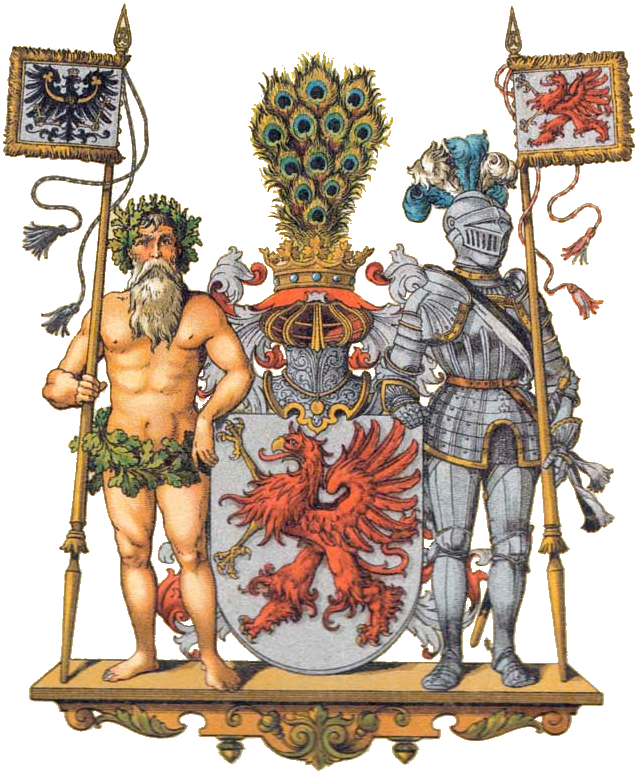
The coat of arms of the Province of Pomerania used from 1881 to 1945.

The Province of Pomerania had established its coat of arms in 1881. It consisted of a white (silver) escutcheon (shield) which depicted a red left-facing griffin with a yellow (golden) beak and claws.

Above the shield was placed a grey (silver) barred helmet with a grey (silver) mantling, and a drapery tied to it. On top of the helmet were a yellow (golden) crown and a ducal hat with a plume of peacock feathers on top. On the sides of the shield was the supporters holding it. To the left, was a wild man, figure depicting an almost-naked male human with a beard wearing oak leaves around his hips, and holding a spear in his right hand. At the top of the spear was attached banner of arms of Prussia, which depicted a black eagle with a yellow (golden) crown on its head, and a yellow (golden) upwards-curved bar, stretched from its chest to the end of its wings, ended in a trefoil, on each of its wings. The creature was placed on a white background. To the right of the shield, was placed a knight in grey (silver) armour, holding a spear in their left hand. At the top of the spear was attached a banner of arms, depicting a red griffin with a yellow (golden) beak and claws, placed on a white background. Both supporters stood on a wooden shelf.

In 1929, the design of the griffin was modernized, with the new version remaining in use until 1945, when the Province of Pomerania ceased to exist.

=== Second Polish Republic ===
The design of the coat of arms of the Pomeranian Voivodeship proposed in 1928.

In 1928, as part of the project to design the coat of arms for the voivodeships of the Second Polish Republic, the design for the coat of arms of the Pomeranian Voivodeship had been created. Though planned to be officially approved, it never was, as it was decided to postpone the approval of the subdivision symbols due to the planned administrative reform, that eventually took place in 1938. Eventually, the plans for the establishment of the coat of arms had been stopped by the Invasion of Poland by Nazi Germany, on 1 September 1939, which began the World War II, and were not picked up back after the end of the conflict.

The proposed design consisted of a white Iberian-style escutcheon, with a square top and rounded base, depicting a red right-facing griffin with a yellow (golden) crown on its head, standing on its back feat and with risen wings.

=== Kashubia ===
The traditional coat of arms of Kashubia.

In 1908, the black griffin with a crown on its head, placed on a yellow background, was introduced as the symbol of the Kashubian people by the writer and activist Aleksander Majkowski, who was the chairperson of the Young Kashubians Association, an organization which aimed at forming and promoting Kashubian national identity. Majkowski was a contributing editor of the magazine Gryf, published by the Young Kashubians Association since 1908. He had chosen to feature this symbol on the magazine cover, to promote it as a symbol of the Kashubian people. It was based on a black griffin on a yellow background, historically used by the heraldry of the House of Griffin, to, among other things, symbolize the region of Kashubia. Traditionally, in their heraldry, the griffin was depicted without a crown on its head. Some historians theorize, that Majkowski's decision includes a crown in his design, was influenced by the depiction of the griffin with crown on its head, present in Greifswald, Germany, and in Oliwa Cathedral, in Gdańsk, Poland. The design became popular among Kashubian people, and was promoted by other Kashubian publications. The symbol was also promoted in literature and poetry, for example, by Aleksander Labuda, Aleksander Majkowski, Jan Rompsczi, and Jan Trepczyk.

The first recorded usage of the banner of arms, and the flag of Kashubia dates back to 18 August 1929 during a Kashubian convention in Kartuzy. Both symbols were flown during the event; first, the flag, featuring two black and yellow horizontal stripes, and then the banner of arms, in the form of a black griffin on a yellow background.

Black griffin on a yellow background was further popularised in 1938, when it was flown as a banner of arms, during the funeral of Aleksander Majkowski. The banner that was flown was made by his sister, Franciszka Majkowska. Since then, it has become a tradition to fly the Kashbian banner of arms during funerals of important Kashubian activists.

=== Mecklenburg–Western Pomerania ===
The seal of the State of Mecklenburg from 1948 to 1952.

The State of Mecklenburg, established in 1945, was a state of the Soviet occupation zone of Germany until 1949, and a state of East Germany until 1952. It included the portion of the historical area of Western Pomerania. Until 1947, it was known as the State of Mecklenburg–Western Pomerania.

In 1945, the minister-president of the state, Wilhelm Höcker, campaigned for the creation of the coat of arms representing both historical regions of Mecklenburg and Western Pomerania. He had presented his proposition to the mayor of Stralsund, Otto Kortüm. The proposed coat of arms was divided horizontally into two fields, The top field head of bull was placed on a background of three diagonal stripes of blue, yellow, and red, which were the historical colours of Mecklenburg. In the bottom field was placed a griffin, inspired by the coat of arms of Rostock, placed on the blue and white background, which were the historical colours of Western Pomerania. Kortüm had rejected the proposal, noting that placement of the bull's head over the griffin, placed Mecklenburg higher in the hierarchy than Pomerania.

In 1947, its government established its flag, which was a historical flag of Mecklenburg with three horizontal stripes of blue, yellow, and red colour. On 18 February 1948, the State of Mecklenburg established the coat of arms that depicted a head of bull with horns and a crown on its head, that it used on its official seals.

On 30 September 1948, the provincial parliament debated the establishment of the coat of arms. Afterward, the proposal designs were requested. The draft presented to the committee depicted a shield divided into two fields. One field depicted a knight sitting on a horse, and holding a banner in their right hand, and a shield with a lion on it, in their left hand. The entire figure was yellow (golden) and placed on a blue background. It was adopted from the coat of arms of Schwerin. The other field depicted a red griffin on a white (silver) background. The draft was not liked by Höcker, and was never presented to the parliament.

The State of Mecklenburg ceased to exist in 1952, being divided into smaller districts. Following the unification of Germany, the state of the Mecklenburg-Vorpommern was created on 3 October 1990, within almost exact same borders.

The unofficial flag of the Mecklenburg-Vorpommern used in 1990.

In 1990, prior to the establishment of the official symbols, the state unofficially used a flag that was divided horizontally into three equal stripes, that were, from top to bottom, dark blue, yellow, and red. In the centre was placed the historical coat of arms of Mecklenburg, in the form of the black head of a bull with white horns wearing a yellow crown, placed in the yellow escutcheon (shield). Such flag was hoisted in front of the Reichstag building in Berlin during the celebrations of the German Unity Day on 3 October 1990.

Great coat of arms of Mecklenburg–Western Pomerania used since 1990.

Small coat of arms of Mecklenburg–Western Pomerania used since 1990.

In 1990, Mecklenburg–Western Pomerania established its symbols. Its great coat of arms consists of an Iberian-style escutcheon (shield) with a square top and rounded base, divided into four fields, of two rows with two fields in each. The top left, and bottom right fields depict a head of a black bull, with a red tongue and white (silver) horns, wearing a yellow (yellow) crown, placed on a yellow (golden) background. It was based on the historical symbols of Mecklenburg. The top right field depicts a red griffin with a yellow (golden) beak and claws, standing on its back legs, with risen wings, and facing to the left, placed on a white (silver) background. It was based on the historical symbols of Western Pomerania. The bottom left field depicts a red eagle with a yellow (golden) beak and claws, with its head facing to the left, and risen wings, each containing a yellow (golden) upwards-curved bar, stretched from its chest to the end of the wing, ended in a trefoil. It was based on the historical symbols of Brandenburg, and represents the Uckermark, a historical region that used to be under the control of the Margraviate of Brandenburg, and which part is located within the state of Mecklenburg–Western Pomerania.

The small coat of arms consists of an Iberian-style escutcheon (shield) with a square top and rounded base, divided vertically into two fields. The left field depicts a head of a black bull, with a red tongue and white (silver) horns, wearing a yellow (yellow) crown, placed on a yellow (golden) background. The right field depicts a red griffin with a yellow (golden) beak and claws, standing on its back legs, with risen wings, and facing to the left, placed on a white (silver) background.

The great coat of arms is used by the Landtag of Mecklenburg-Vorpommern, and the highest state authorities, while the small coat of arms, by the other state authorities.

The bull and griffin from the coat of arms are also featured in the state flag, which was also established in 1991.

=== Third Polish Republic ===
The coat of arms of the Gdańsk Voivodeship, used from 1996 to 1998.

The Gdańsk Voivodeship of Third Republic of Poland, had established its coat of arms on 11 September 1996. It consisted of the orange (golden) Iberian-style escutcheon (shield), with a square top and rounded base. It depicted a black griffin, facing left, standing on its back legs, and having risen wings. It had a yellow (golden) beak with a red tongue put out, and yellow (golden) claws. The Gdańsk Voivodeship ceased to exist on 31 December 1998, and its territories were incorporated into then-established Pomeranian Voivodeship.

The coat of arms of the West Pomeranian Voivodeship used since 2000.

The West Pomeranian Voivodeship had adopted its coat of arms on 23 October 2000. The coat of arms depicts a red griffin with a yellow (golden) beak and claws standing in the combat position, placed within the white (silver) Iberian-style escutcheon. It was designed by Jerzy Bąk, and its design was based on the red griffin present on the banner used by the forces of Casimir V, duke of Pomerania-Stettin, during the Battle of Grunwald in 1410. Its design is also present in the voivodeship flag.

In 1999, following the establishment of the Pomeranian Voivodeship, the local government began the process of choosing its coat of arms, which lasted two years. There were two projects proposed, and two debated symbols, were the historical coat of arms of Royal Prussia, and the historical coat of arms of Kashubia. The first symbol depicted a white (silver) shield with a black eagle, with a golden (yellow) crown on its neck, from which reaches an arm in silver armor, holding a sword above the head of the bird, turned to the viewer's left. It is placed on a white (silver) background. Its alternative version depicted a white (silver) bird in a red shield. The second symbol depicted a black griffin in a yellow (golden) shield. As the compromise, the proposed symbol would depict a black (or white) eagle, with a golden (yellow) crown on its neck, from which reaches an arm in silver armor, holding a sword above the head of the bird, turned to the viewer's left. On its chest would be a yellow (golden) shield depicting a black griffin, standing on its back feet, with risen front legs and wings. Such project had been drew by Wawrzyniec Samp, and was met with positive opinion during one of the deliberations in the Pomeranian Voivodeship Sejmik, however, in June 2001, it was removed from the agenda of Sejmik.

The coat of arms of the Pomeranian Voivodeship used from 2002 to 2008, and again since 2010.

Soon after, the Pomeranian Voivodeship Sejmik had approved a different design of the coat of arms, made by Wawrzyniec Samp, which consisted of a yellow (golden) Iberian style escutcheon, depicting a black griffin, standing on its back feet, with its front legs and winds rose, a red tongue put out from its opened beak, and a tail that splits into two in a middle of its length. The design of the griffin was based on the 16th century fresco located in the Oliwa Cathedral in Gdańsk. Such a decision had been criticized and opposed by some local politicians and scholars, as it was believed that such a coat of arms only represented Kashubia, and omitted other regions of the voivodeship, that would be otherwise represented by the historical coat of arms of Royal Prussia. It was also noted, that its design, was similar to of the logo of the Kashubian-Pomeranian Association, some of which members, were also members of sejmik. Furthermore, the coat of arms had been criticized by the Heraldic Commission of Poland, which shared the opinion, that the prior proposition of a combination of both coats of arms, placed in a red shield, was more suitable. Despite that, the commission's opinion was only observational, and could not stop the sejmik from legally implementing the coat of arms. However, in accordance with its opinion, the design had been visually rejected to their visual corrections. On 28 January 2002, the sejmik held a second vote on the design, approving it as the symbol of the voivodeship.

The coat of arms of the Pomeranian Voivodeship used from 2008 to 2010.

In 2008, the voivodeship executive board had modified the design of the griffin, and shade of the shield, without the approval of the Regional Assembly, as part of their campaign to promote the region. The previous design had been re-established in 2010 and remains in use to the present day.

== Contemporary use ==
=== Mecklenburg–Western Pomerania ===
Great coat of arms of Mecklenburg–Western Pomerania.

Small coat of arms of Mecklenburg–Western Pomerania.

The great coat of arms of Mecklenburg–Western Pomerania, Germany consists of an Iberian-style escutcheon (shield) with square top and rounded base, divided into four fields, of two rows with two fields in each. The top left and bottom right fields depict a head of a black bull, with a red tongue and white (silver) horns, wearing a yellow (yellow) crown, placed on a yellow (golden) background. It was based on the historical symbols of Mecklenburg. The top right field depicts a red griffin with a yellow (golden) beak and claws, standing on its back legs, with risen wings, and facing to the left, placed on a white (silver) background. It was based on the historical symbols of Western Pomerania. The bottom left field depicts a red eagle with a yellow (golden) beak and claws, with its head facing to the left, and risen wings, each containing a yellow (golden) upwards-curved bar, stretched from its chest to the end of the wing, ended in a trefoil. It was based on the historical symbols of Brandenburg, and represents the Uckermark, a historical region that used to be under the control of the Margraviate of Brandenburg, and which part is located within the state of Mecklenburg–Western Pomerania.

The small coat of arms consists of an Iberian-style escutcheon (shield) with a square top and rounded base, divided vertically into two fields. The left field depicts a head of a black bull, with a red tongue and white (silver) horns, wearing a yellow (yellow) crown, placed on a yellow (golden) background. The right field depicts a red griffin with yellow (golden) beak and claws, standing on its back legs, with risen wings, and facing to the left, placed on a white (silver) background.

The great coat of arms is used by the Landtag of Mecklenburg-Vorpommern, and the highest state authorities, while the small coat of arms, by the other state authorities.

=== Pomeranian Voivodeship ===
The coat of arms of the Pomeranian Voivodeship.

The coat of arms of the Pomeranian Voivodeship, Poland consists of a yellow (golden) Iberian style escutcheon, depicting a black griffin, standing on its back feet, with its front legs and winds rose, a red tongue put out from its opened beak, and a tail that splits into two in middle of its length. The design of the griffin was based on the 16th century fresco located in the Oliwa Cathedral in Gdańsk.

=== West Pomeranian Voivodeship ===
The coat of arms of the West Pomeranian Voivodeship used since 2000.

The coat of arms of the West Pomeranian Voivodeship, Poland depicts a red griffin with a yellow (golden) beak and claws standing in the combat position, placed within the white (silver) Iberian style escutcheon. It was designed by Jerzy Bąk, and its design was based on the red griffin present on the banner used by the forces of Casimir V, duke of Pomerania-Stettin, during the Battle of Grunwald in 1410.

=== Kashubia ===
The coat of arms of Kashubia, in accordance to the standards proposed by the Kashubian Association.

A traditional symbol of the cultural region of Kashubia in Poland, and Kashubian people, is a black griffin standing on its back legs, with risen front paws and wings, placed on a yellow (golden) background. There is not a single standardized version of the symbol. The creature is usually facing left from the viewer's point of view, and usually wears either a yellow (golden) or black crown on its head.

In accordance with the standard proposed by the Kashubian Association, one the most popular Kashubian organizations, the coat of arms consists of the yellow (golden) Iberian-style escutcheon depicting a left-facing black griffin standing on its back feet and with its wings and front paws risen. It wears a yellow (golden) crown on its head, and has yellow (golden) claws, beak, and eyes, and a red tongue sticking out of its mouth. It has a black tail, curled down between its legs.

Other versions can include the design with black claws and beak, with a black crown, and without a red tongue.
