= Flag of Western Pomerania =

- Proportion: 3:5
- Adopted: 1996 (current version); 22 October 1882 (first version)
- Design: A horizontal divided into light blue and white stripes

The flag that serves as the symbol of the historical and geographical region of the Western Pomerania is divided horizontally into two stripes: light blue on the top and white on the bottom. It originated as the flag of the Province of Pomerania, Prussia, used from 1882 to 1935. Since 1996, it is officially recognized as the symbol of the historical region of Western Pomerania within Mecklenburg–Western Pomerania, Germany.

== Design ==
The flag is a rectangle divided horizontally into two stripes: light blue on the top and white on the bottom. The aspect ratio height to width ratio, used in the flag established in 1996, is equal 3:5. The aspect ratio originally used by the historical Province of Pomerania from 1882 to 1935, was 2:3.

== History ==
=== Pomeranian duchies ===
The banner used by the forces of Casimir V, duke of Pomerania-Stettin, during the Battle of Grunwald in 1410.

The griffin is a traditional symbol of the West Pomerania, used since 12th century. Between 12th and 13th century, the griffin become the symbol of the House of Griffin, that ruled in that area. Subsequently, the red griffin on the white background had become the symbol of the Duchy of the Pomerania-Stettin. In the 1730s, that design had become the symbol of the entire Western Pomerania. In 1410, during the Battle of Grunwald, the forces of Casimir V, duke of Pomerania-Stettin, used a white banner with a red griffin on it.

=== Province of Pomerania ===
Flag of the Province of Pomerania, Prussia used from 1882 to 1935.

In 1802, the provisional representatives in the Order-in-Council of the Kingdom of Prussia, under the rule of king Frederick William III of Prussia, were ordered to wear blue greatcoats, in addition to theirs mess dress uniforms. To distinguish representatives of different provinces, the collars of the greatcoats were assigned different colours. Originally, the representatives of the Province of Pomerania had white and gold (yellow) collars. In 1813, the representatives of Pomerania were given entirely white collars.

Additionally, the soldieries of the Pomeranian Landwehr formations were given blue uniforms with white collars. Colours of such design became associated with the colours of the province. On 22 October 1882, the blue and white were legally defined as the colours of the province, including the establishment of the flag. It was divided horizontally into two equal stripes: light blue on top, and white on the bottom. Its aspect ratio height to width ratio was equal 2:3. The blue was officially defined as Prussian blue (dark blue), however, it wasn't popular, with usage of light blue being preferred instead. The flag was used until 1935, when Nazi Germany forbid its provinces from using its flags, ordering them to replace them with the national flag.

=== Mecklenburg–Western Pomerania ===
The unofficial flag of Mecklenburg–Western Pomerania used in 1990.

The state of Mecklenburg–Western Pomerania, Germany, had established its flag in 1990, following the German reunification. In 1990, prior to the establishment of the official flag, the state unofficially used the historical flag of Mecklenburg. It was a rectangle divided horizontally into three equal stripes, that were, from top to bottom, dark blue, yellow, and red. In the centre was placed the historical coat of arms of Mecklenburg, in form of the black head of a bull in yellow crown with white horns, placed in the yellow escutcheon (shield). Such flag was hoisted in front of the Reichstag building in Berlin during the celebrations of the German Unity Day on 3 October 1990.

Civil flag of Mecklenburg–Western Pomerania used since 1990.

State flag of Mecklenburg–Western Pomerania used since 1990.

The official flag of the state had been adopted on 29 January 1991. It was designed by Norbert Buske. The civil flag consists of five horizontal stripes, that are from the top to bottom: blue (ultramarine), white, yellow, white, and red (vermilion). The proportions of the stripes are equal to 4:3:1:3:4. The colors are combined from the flags of two historical regions of the country, blue and white flag of Western Pomerania, and blue-yellow-red flag of Mecklenburg. The state flag has a similar design, with the two charges from the coat of arms of the state, additionally placed in the center. It includes a black head of a bull with white horns wearing a yellow crown, placed on the left, and a red griffin with yellow beak and claws, placed on the right. The portion of the yellow stripe behind them, is replaced with the white background.

=== Historical region of Western Pomerania ===
The flag of the historical region of Western Pomerania used since 1996.

In 1996, the design based on the flag of the historical province of Pomerania, had been officially recognized as the symbol of the historical region of Western Pomerania within Mecklenburg–Western Pomerania, Germany. The flag is a rectangle divided horizontally into two stripes: light blue on the top and white on the bottom. The aspect ratio height to width ratio is equal 3:5, as opposed to 2:3, used by the original flag of the province of Pomerania. The flag is also occasionally flown in Poland.

=== West Pomeranian Voivodeship ===
The flag of the West Pomeranian Voivodeship, Poland, used since 2000.

The West Pomeranian Voivodeship, Poland was established in 1999. Its flag is a rectangle with the aspect ratio of height to width ratio equal 5:8. It is divided into three equal vertical stripes, that are white, red, and white. In the middle of the flag, within the red stripe, is the coat of arms of the voivodeship, a white shield, with red griffin with golden (yellow) beak and claws, that is faced to the right. The flag was designed by Hanna Dąbrowska, while the coat of arms in the flag's design was by Jerzy Bąk. The design was based on the red griffin present on the banner used by the forces of Casimir V, duke of Pomerania-Stettin, during the Battle of Grunwald in 1410. It was approved by the West Pomeranian Voivodeship Sejmik on 23 November 2000.

== See also ==
- Coat of arms of Pomerania
- Flag of Mecklenburg-Vorpommern
- Flag of the West Pomeranian Voivodeship
- Flag of Mecklenburg
- Flag of the Pomeranian Voivodeship
- Flag of Kashubia
