= Black and yellow flag =

The black and yellow flag may refer to:

- the flag of the Habsburg monarchy
- the flag of Saint David
- the flag of Kashubia
- the black and gold flag of anarcho-capitalism
