= Bogislaw (coin) =

16th-century silver coin minted in Duchy of Pomerania

- Duchy of Pomerania
- Mass: 4.57 g (0.16 oz) (originally); 4.86 g (0.17 oz) (later mintings)
- Diameter: 32 mm
- Years of minting: 1500

Obverse
- Design: Coat of arms of Pomerania, depicting a griffin, placed on top of a cross, with the inscription "BOGVSLAVS•DUX•STETIN [or STETIEN]•MVC".
- Design date: 1500
- Design discontinued: 1523

Reverse
- Design: Image of Mary of Nazareth with the inscription "CONSERVANOS•DOMINA"
- Design date: 1523
- Design discontinued: 1523

Bogislaw (Polish: Bogusław) was a silver coin minted in the Duchy of Pomerania in Central Europe, during the reign of duke Bogislaw X from 1500 to 1523. It was worth ½ of a mark, 8 shillings or 1/6 of a guilder. It was minted in the city of Szczecin, which served as the country's capital.

== History and decryption ==
The coin was minted in the Duchy of Pomerania in Central Europe, during the reign of duke Bogislaw X, after whom it was named. It was first minted in the city of Szczecin in 1500, and continued to be made until the death of Bogislaw X in 1523.

Originally it weighed 4.57 g (0.16 oz), of which 4.32 g (0.15 oz) was pure silver. Later, its mass was increased to 4.86 g (0.17 oz), while the mass of silver itself was decreased to 4.29 g (0.15 oz). Its diameter measured 32 mm (1.3 inch).

On the obverse, the coin featured an image of Mary of Nazareth with a Latin inscription "CONSERVANOS•DOMINA", meaning "Out Lady, protect us". The reverse featured the coat of arms of Pomerania, depicting a griffin standing on its hide legs, placed on top of a cross, and bearing a Latin inscription which read "BOGVSLAVS•DUX•STETIN [or STETIEN]•MVC", meaning "Bogislaw, the Duke of Stettin, 1500".
