= Sea-griffin =

Heraldic animal in the form of a griffin

A sea-griffin.

The sea-griffin (German: Fischgreif; Polish: rybogryf, gryf morski or mergriffin) is a heraldic charge in form of an aquatic griffin with the head, upper half, wings, and talons of an eagle and the lower half of a fish.

== History ==
The coat of arms of the Puttkamer family, claimed to be related to Swienca family.

The symbol originates from the region of Schlawe and Stolp Land in Pomerania, Central Europe. It was used in the coat of arms of the Swienca family, which held powerful offices in the area in the 13th and 14th centuries. When they died out around 1316, the area went back under the direct rule of the House of Griffin, which continued to use the sea-griffin in the regional coat of arms.

The historical coat of arms of the Duchy of Pomerania, depicting a sea-griffin in one of its fields.

The sea-griffin was one of the nine charges present in the coat of arms of the Duchy of Pomerania introduced around 1530. It was a white (silver) sea-griffin facing viewer's left and placed within a red field. It was meant to represent the island of Usedom, despite it never having been used as its symbol before. It is also present in the coat of arms of the Puttkamer family, which, according to some historians, is related to Swienca family, although this remains debated.

== Modern use ==
Today, the sea-griffin is used in various municipal coats of arms in Pomeranian and West Pomeranian Voivodeships in northern Poland. These include the cities of Darłowo, Łeba, Sianów, and Sławno, as well as the coat of arms of the counties of Sławno, and Tuchola, and the gminas (municipalities) of Gniewino, Potęgowo, Sławno, Trzebielino, and Tuchomie. It is also present in the coat of arms of the commune of Trouville-la-Haule in Normandy, France.

== Gallery ==
Coat of arms of Sławno County.

Coat of arms of Tuchola County.

Coat of arms of Darłowo.

Coat of arms of Łeba.

Coat of arms of Sianów.

Coat of arms of Sławno.

Coat of arms of Gmina Gniewino.

Coat of arms of Gmina Potęgowo.

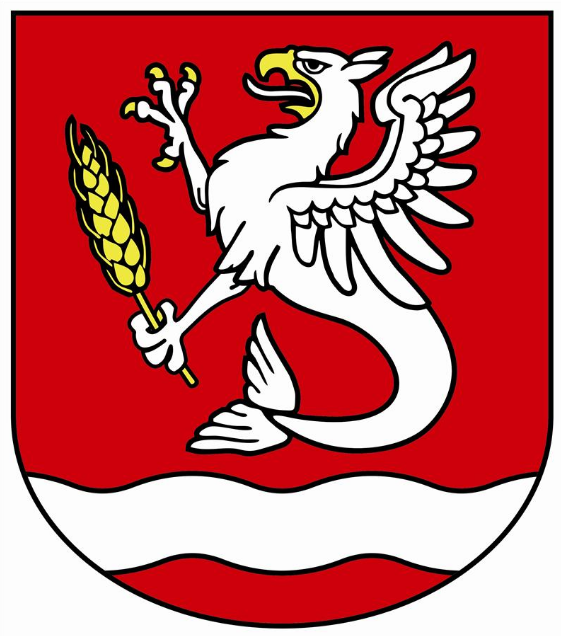
Coat of arms of Gmina Sławno.

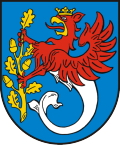
Coat of arms of Gmina Trzebielino.

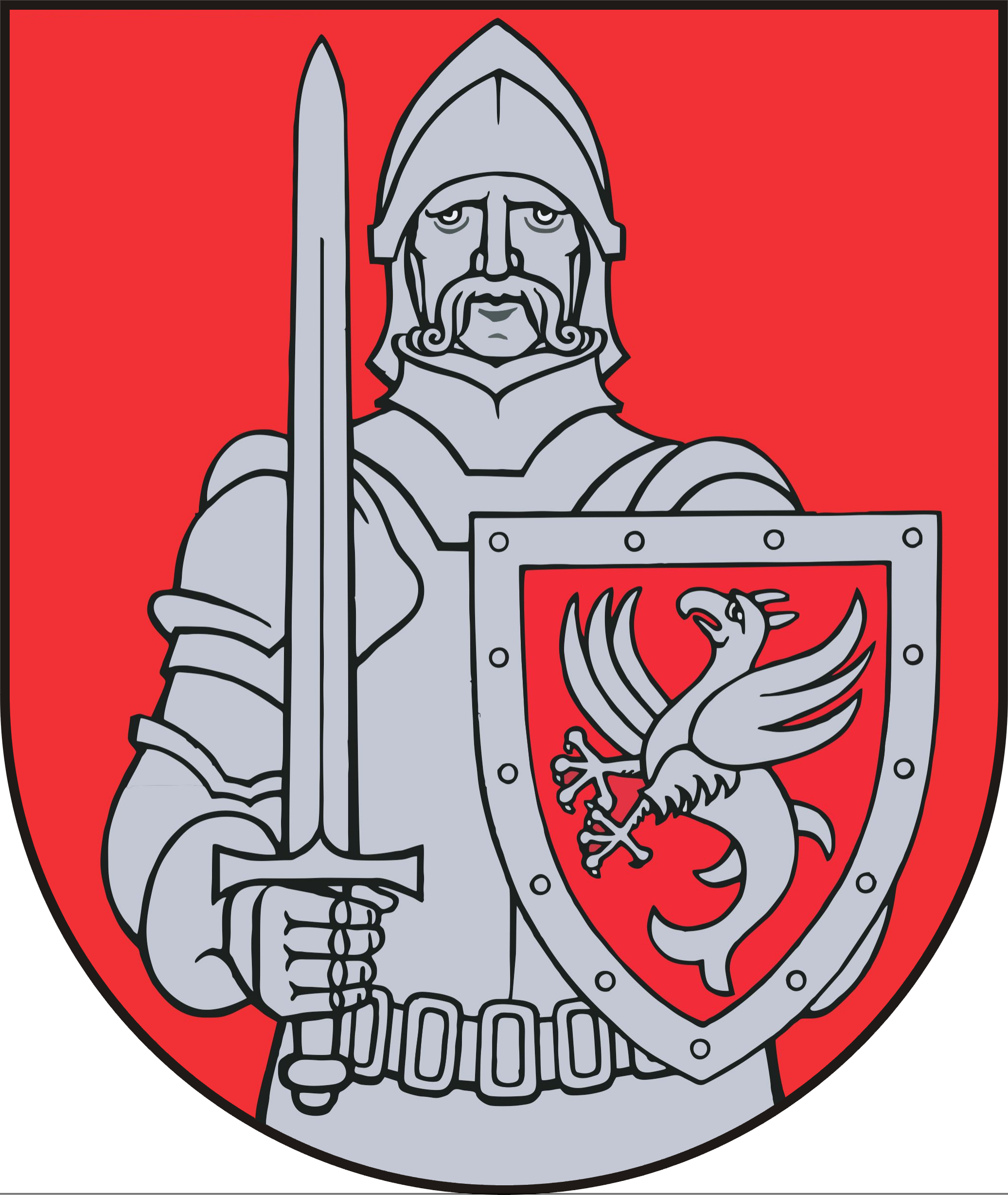
Coat of arms of Gmina Tuchomie.

Coat of arms of the commune of Trouville-la-Haule.

== See also ==
- Griffin
- Hippogriff
- Sea-lion
- Siren (mythology)
