= Flag of Pomeranian Voivodeship =

Flag of the Pomeranian Voivodeship, Poland

Pomeranian Voivodeship
- Proportion: 5:8
- Adopted: 25 March 2002 (first establishment); 2010 (reestablishment of the current design)
- Design: Yellow rectangle with a left-faced black griffin placed in the centre
- Designed by: Wawrzyniec Samp

The flag of the Pomeranian Voivodeship is a yellow rectangle with a left-faced black griffin placed in the centre. It was designed by Wawrzyniec Samp, and adapted on 25 March 2002.

== Design ==
The flag of the Pomeranian Voivodeship is a yellow rectangle, with an aspect ratio of height to width of 5:8, with a left-faced black griffin placed in the centre. The griffin is standing on two feet with lifted wings, his red tonged out, and double black tail. The design of the charge had been adopted from the coat of arms of the voivodeship.

The colours of the coat of arms and the flag were based on the coat of arms of Kashubia, that depicted a black griffin on the yellow background. The design of the griffin was based on the 16th century fresco located in the Oliwa Cathedral in Gdańsk.

== History ==
The flag of West Prussia, used from 1886 to 1920.

Prior to the establishment of the modern Pomeranian Voivodeship, from 18th to 20th century, most of the region, was administrated within the West Prussia, a province of Prussia. On 9 November 1886, the province established its flag, which was divided into three equally-sized horizontal stripes, that were, black, white, and black. The aspect ratio of the flag's height to its width was equal 2:3. It was used until 1920, when the province was partitioned between the Pomeranian Voivodeship, and Posen-West Prussia. In 1923, the flag inspired design of the flag of Posen-West Prussia, which was a combination of the flags of the provinces of West Prussia and Posen.

The flag of the Pomeranian Voivodeship used from 2008 to 2010.

The modern Pomeranian Voivodeship had been established in 1999. The flag and the coat of arms of the voivodeship were designed by Wawrzyniec Samp. The Heraldic Commission criticized the design, pointing out that the usage of the griffin together with a black eagle with an arm holding a sword, a historical symbol of Royal Prussia, was more appropriate to represent the region. However, both flag and the coat of arms were approved by the Pomeranian Regional Assembly inspire of that, and officially adopted on 25 March 2002, with the resolution no. 542/XL/02.

In 2008, the voivodeship executive board modified the design of the griffin, and shade of the flag, without the approval of the Regional Assembly, as part of their campaign to promote the region. The previous design had been reestablished in 2010, and remains in use till present day.

== See also ==
- Coat of arms of the Pomeranian Voivodeship
- Flag of Kashubia
- Coat of arms of Kashubia
