= Flag of Mecklenburg-Vorpommern =

Mecklenburg-Vorpommern
- Use: Civil flag and ensign
- Proportion: 3:5
- Adopted: 29 January 1991
- Designed by: Norbert Buske
- State flag
- Use: State flag and ensign
- Proportion: 3:5
- Adopted: 29 January 1991; 35 years ago
- Designed by: Norbert Buske

The civil flag that serves as the symbol of the state of Mecklenburg-Vorpommern, Germany, consists of five horizontal stripes, that are from the top to bottom: blue (ultramarine), white, yellow, white, and red (vermilion). It was designed by Norbert Buske and adopted on 29 January 1991. It is a combination of the historical flags of the Mecklenburg and Western Pomerania.

== Design ==
The civil flag consists of five horizontal stripes, that are from the top to bottom: blue (ultramarine), white, yellow, white, and red (vermilion). The proportions of the stripes are equal to 4:3:1:3:4. The aspect ratio of the flag height to its width is equal 3:5. The colours are combined from the flags of two historical regions of the country, blue and white flag of Western Pomerania, and blue-yellow-red flag of Mecklenburg.

The state flag has a similar design, with the two charges from the coat of arms of the state, additionally placed in the centre. It includes a black head of a bull with white horns wearing a yellow crown, placed on the left, and a red griffin with yellow beak and claws, placed on the right. The portion of the yellow stripe behind them, is replaced with the white background.

Color	CMYK	HKS	RAL
Blue	100/70/0/0	43	RAL 5002
Yellow	0/0/100/0	3	RAL 1021
Red	0/100/100/0	13	RAL 3020

== History ==
=== Mecklenburg ===
The flag of Mecklenburg, used between 1813 and 1952.

On 26 March 1813, from orders of grand duke Frederick Francis I, the Grand Duchy of Mecklenburg-Schwerin had adopted the which consisted of three horizontal stripes of equal width: blue, yellow, and red. The blue colour represented the historical Lordship of Rostock, the yellow colour, the Mecklenburg, and the red colour, the historical County of Schwerin.

The civil ensign of the Grand Duchy of Mecklenburg-Schwerin.

On 24 March 1855, the Grand Duchy of Mecklenburg-Schwerin established its civil ensign, which consisted of three horizontal stripes of equal width: blue, white, and red. Such design had been used as the flag of the city of Rostock in Mecklenburg, since 14th century.

On 23 December 1863, the Grand Duchy of Mecklenburg-Schwerin adopted the flag protocol, confirming the blue-yellow-red flag, and on 4 January 1864, the Grand Duchy of Mecklenburg-Strelitz, did the same, adopting identical flag. Both states existed until 1918, when they were replaced by the Free State of Mecklenburg-Schwerin, and the Free State of Mecklenburg-Strelitz. In 1934, they were merged into the Gau Mecklenburg. The blue-yellow-blue flag remained in use until 1935, when Nazi Germany forbid its provinces from using its flags, ordering them to replace them with the national flag.

The flag was reestablished in 1947, as the symbol of the State of Mecklenburg, which existed until 1952.

=== Western Pomerania ===
Flag of the Province of Pomerania, Prussia used from 1882 to 1935.

In 1802, the provisional representatives in the Order in Council of the Kingdom of Prussia, under the rule of king Frederick William III of Prussia, were ordered to wear blue greatcoats, in addition to theirs mess dress uniforms. To distinguish representatives of different provinces, the collars of the greatcoats were assigned different colours. Originally, the representatives of the Province of Pomerania had white and gold (yellow) collars. In 1813, the representatives of Pomerania were given entirely white collars. Additionally, the soldieries of the Pomeranian Landwehr formations were given blue uniforms with white collars. Colours of such design became associated with the colours of the province. On 22 October 1882, the blue and white were legally defined as the colours of the province, including the establishment of the flag. It was divided horizontally into two equal stripes: light blue on top, and white on the bottom. Its aspect ratio height to width ratio was equal 2:3. The blue was officially defined as Prussian blue (dark blue), however, it wasn't popular, with usage of light blue being preferred instead. The flag was used until 1935, when Nazi Germany forbid its provinces from flying its flags, ordering them to replace them with the national flag.

=== Provisional flag ===
The unofficial flag of the Mecklenburg-Vorpommern used in 1990.

In 1990, prior to the establishment of the official flag, the state of Mecklenburg-Vorpommern unofficially used a modified historical flag of Mecklenburg. It was a rectangle divided horizontally into three equal stripes, that were, from top to bottom, dark blue, yellow, and red. In the centre was placed the historical coat of arms of Mecklenburg, in form of the black head of a bull with white horns wearing a yellow crown, placed in the yellow escutcheon (shield). Such flag was hoisted in front of the Reichstag building in Berlin during the celebrations of the German Unity Day on 3 October 1990.

=== Official flag ===
The official current flag of the state had been adopted on 29 January 1991. It was designed by Norbert Buske. The colours of the flag are combined from the flags of two historical regions of the country, blue and white flag of Western Pomerania, and blue-yellow-red flag of Mecklenburg.

== Flags of the historical regions ==
The flag of the historical region of Mecklenburg

The flag of the historical region of Western Pomerania

In 1996, the historical regions of Mecklenburg, and Western Pomerania, had been given official status within the state of Mecklenburg-Vorpommern, Germany. The flag of Western Pomerania consists of two horizontal stripes of the equal width: blue and white. The flag of Mecklenburg consists of three horizontal stripes of the equal width: blue, yellow, and red. Both flags have the aspect ratio height to width ratio is equal 3:5.

== See also ==
- Coat of arms of Mecklenburg-Vorpommern
- Flag of Western Pomerania
- Flag of Mecklenburg
- Flag of the West Pomeranian Voivodeship
