= Flag of the West Pomeranian Voivodeship =

West Pomeranian Voivodeship
- Proportion: 5:8
- Adopted: 23 November 2000
- Design: Rectangle divided vertically in 3 stripes with white, red, and white colour, and with the coat of arms of the West Pomeranian Voivodeship in the middle
- Designed by: Hanna Dąbrowska (flag layout); Jerzy Bąk (coat of arms)

The flag of the West Pomeranian Voivodeship in Poland is a triband rectangle, divided vertically in 3 stripes of white, red, and white colour, and with the coat of arms of the voivodeship in the middle. It was adopted in 2000.

== Design ==
The flag of the West Pomeranian Voivodeship is a rectangle with the aspect ratio of height to width ratio equal 5:8. It is divided into three equal vertical stripes, that are white, red, and white. In the middle of the flag, within the red stripe, is the coat of arms of the voivodeship, a white shield, with red griffin with golden (yellow) beak and claws, that is faced to the right.

The white colour is described in the hex triplet system as #FFFFFF, the red as #D22730, and the yellow, as #F7D417.

Colour model	White	Red	Yellow
CMYK	0.0.0.0	0.81.77.18	0.14.90.3
RGB	(255,255,255)	(210,39,48)	(247,212,23)
Hex	#FFFFFF	#D22730	#F7D417

== History ==
The banner used by the forces of Casimir V, duke of Pomerania-Stettin, during the Battle of Grunwald in 1410.

The griffin is a traditional symbol of the West Pomerania, used since 12th century. Between 12th and 13th century, the griffin become the symbol of the House of Griffin, that ruled in that area. Subsequently, the red griffin on the white background had become the symbol of the Duchy of the Pomerania-Stettin. In the 1730s, that design had become the symbol of the entire West Pomerania. In 1410, during the Battle of Grunwald, the forces of Casimir V, duke of Pomerania-Stettin, used a white banner with a red griffin on it.

Flag of the Province of Pomerania, used from 1882 to 1935.

The Province of Pomerania, which was partially located within modern borders of the West Pomeranian Voivodeship, adopted its flag on 22 October 1882. It was rectangle divided horizontally into two stripes: light blue on top, and white on the bottom. Its aspect ratio height to width ratio was equal 2:3. The flag was used until 1935, when Nazi Germany forbid its provinces from flying its flags, ordering them to replace them with the national flag. Since 1996, the flag is officially recognized as the symbol of the historical region of Western Pomerania within Mecklenburg-Vorpommern, Germany.

The West Pomeranian Voivodeship was established in 1999. Its flag was designed by Hanna Dąbrowska, while the coat of arms present in the flag's design, by Jerzy Bąk. The design was based on the red griffin present on the banner used by the forces of Casimir V, duke of Pomerania-Stettin, during the Battle of Grunwald in 1410. It was approved by the West Pomeranian Voivodeship Sejmik on 23 November 2000.

== See also ==
- Coat of arms of the West Pomeranian Voivodeship
- Flag of Mecklenburg-Vorpommern
- Flag of Western Pomerania
