= Gertrud von Puttkamer =

20th-century German writer and noblewoman

- Born: Gertrud Günther; 4 April 1881; Eydtkuhnen, East Prussia; Kingdom of Prussia; German Empire
- Died: 30 September 1944 (aged 63); Katzenelnbogen, Rhine Province; German Reich
- Noble family: Puttkamer (by marriage)
- Spouse: Baron Heinrich Georg Ludwig von Puttkamer (1900–1914; his death)
- Issue: Baron Jesco Gunther Heinrich von Puttkamer
- Father: Karl Günther
- Mother: Emmy Siemssen
- Occupation: writer, poet

Baroness Gertrud von Puttkamer (Gertrud Freifrau von Puttkamer in German; born Gertrud Günther, 4 April 1881 – 27 or 30 September 1944), also known by her pen name Marie-Madeleine, was a German writer of lesbian-themed erotic literature and homoerotic poetry. Her first book, Auf Kypros, sold over one million copies during her lifetime.

== Life ==
Gertrud Günther was born on 4 April 1881 in Eydtkuhnen (now in Nesterovsky District, Kaliningrad Oblast, Russia), East Prussia in the Kingdom of Prussia to Jewish parents. Her father was Karl Günther, a merchant, and her mother was Emmy Siemssen, a housewife. She grew up within Eydtkuhnen's middle class Jewish community. In 1900, at the age of nineteen, she married Baron Heinrich Georg Ludwig von Puttkamer, a member of the Pomeranian nobility who was 35 years her senior. Upon her marriage, Baroness von Puttkamer moved into a villa with her husband in Grunewald, Berlin and frequently traveled to Vienna, Paris, Nice, and Monte Carlo where she socialized with Hollywood actors, European royalty and nobility, artists, and writers and began using morphine recreationally. In her novella Morphium, von Puttkamer describes how her morphine use began in 1914 when a doctor injected her with the drug to quiet her uncontrollable grief at her husband's deathbed.

== Writing ==
In 1900, von Puttkamer published her first book of poetry under the pen-name Marie-Madeleine, titled Auf Kypros, which was a collection of lesbian-themed erotic verses. Auf Kypros became a best-seller throughout the German Empire, particularly in high society circles. At the time, her work was seen as contrary to societal standards on morality and was even considered pornographic. Throughout the next fourteen years, von Puttkamer published 28 more books, including poetry, short stories, plays and novels. By 1910, her writings were not only centered on lesbian erotic love but also on the use of morphine. By the end of her life, von Puttkamer had written over 46 works.

=== List of works ===
A list of some of von Puttkamer's known works include:

- Auf Kypros (1900)
- Das Bisschen Liebe (1900)
- Die drei Nächte (1901)
- An der Liebe Narrenseil (1902)
- Die Indische Felsentaube (1902)
- Aus faulem Holze (1902)
- Im Spielerparadies: Momentphotographien aus Monte Carlo (1903)
- Frivol: Aus dem Leben eines Pferdes (1903)
- Krabben (1903)
- Arme Ritter! (1904)
- In Seligkeit und Sünden (1905)
- Das Bißchen Liebe (1906)
- Der Rote Champion (1906)
- Die Kleider der Herzogin (1906)
- Die letzte Hürde (1907)
- Die Kusine (1908)
- Die Wegweiserin (1908)
- Prinz Christian (1909)
- Die Stelle, wo sie sterblich sind ... (1909)
- Brennende Liebe (1910)
- Katzen (1910)
- Die heiligsten Güter (1911)
- Die rote Rose Leidenschaft (1912)
- Pantherkätzchen (1913)
- Der süße Rausch (1916)
- Taumel (1920)
- Ausgewählte Werke (1924)
- Die Töchter des Prometheus (1926)
- Ihr schlechter Ruf (1928)

== Later life and death ==
During the Third Reich, von Puttkamer's identity was discovered by the Nazis. In 1932, her writings were condemned as degenerate and ordered to be burned. In 1943, she was committed to a sanatorium in Katzenelnbogen under the pretense of treating her morphine addiction. She died on 27 or 30 September 1944 while under the care of Nazi doctors.

== Legacy ==
In 2016, Baroness von Puttkamer's rediscovered works were translated into English and compiled into the book Priestess of Morphine: The Lost Writings of Marie-Madeleine in the Time of Nazis by Ronald K. Siegel. An operatic monodrama about von Puttkamer's life, The Priestess of Morphine: A Forensic Study of Marie-Madeleine in the Time of the Nazis, was created and recorded by composer Rosśa Crean and writer Aiden K. Feltkamp. The staged version premiered in 2019 at the International Museum of Surgical Science in Chicago and went on to have performances in Perth, Australia.
