= Statue of Swantopolk the Great =

Monument in Gdańsk, Poland

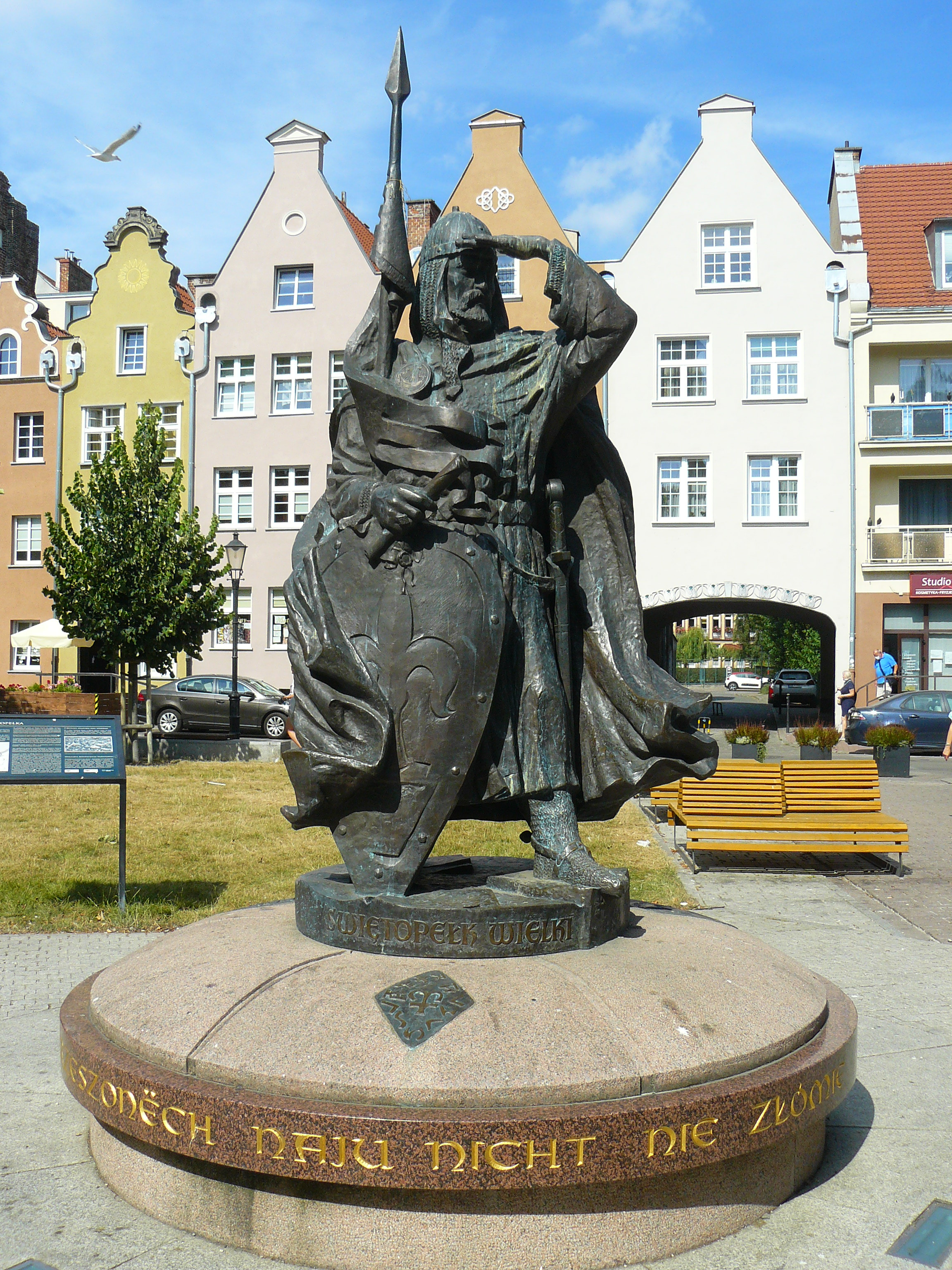
- The monument in 2020.
- Interactive map of Statue of Swantopolk the Great
- Location: Swantopolk II the Great Square, Downtown, Gdańsk, Poland
- Coordinates: 54°21′06.3″N 18°39′11.8″E
- Designer: Wawrzyniec Samp
- Type: Statue
- Material: Bronze
- Height: 2.8 m (9 ft 2 in)
- Opening date: 22 August 2010
- Dedicated to: Swantopolk II

The statue of Swantopolk the Great (Polish: Pomnik Świętopełka Wielkiego) is a bronze statue in Gdańsk, Poland, located in the Main City neighbourhood, within the Downtown district. It is placed at the Swantopolk II the Great Square, between Grobla II, Świętojańska, Szeroka, and Złotników Streets. The monument is dedicated to Duke Swantopolk II (also known as Swantopolk the Great), ruler of the Duchy of Gdańsk from 1227 and 1266. It was designed by Wawrzyniec Samp and unveiled on 22 August 2010.

== History ==
The monument was designed by sculptor Wawrzyniec Samp and financed by the Kashubian–Pomeranian Association. It was dedicated to duke Swantopolk II, ruler of the Duchy of Gdańsk from 1227 and 1266. The statue was unveiled on 22 August 2010, on the 750th anniversary of Saint Dominic Fair.

== Characteristics ==
The monument is placed at the Swantopolk II the Great Square (Polish: Skwer Świętopełka II Wielkiego), between Grobla II, Świętojańska, Szeroka, and Złotników Streets. It is located in the Main City neighbourhood, within the Downtown district of Gdańsk. The monument consists of a bronze statue of Swantopolk II, wearing chain mail, robes, a metal helmet and a cape. He is looking forward, using his left hand to block out the sun, while his right hand holds the town privileges charter of Gdańsk, while resting on a shield placed vertically on a ground before him that features fleur-de-lis on it, a symbol of his dynasty. Between his forearm and his body is also held vertically a pike with a battle flag on it. He is depicted in an elder age with a beard. The statue has a height of 2.8 m and has a small circular base, with a Polish inscription that reads: "Świętopełk Wielki" (Swantopolk the Great). It is placed on a larger circular stone pedestal, which features a Kashubian inscription that reads: "Zrzeszonëch naju nicht nie złómie" (Nobody will be break us, while we are united).
