= Georg Ludwig von Puttkamer =

Prussian major general

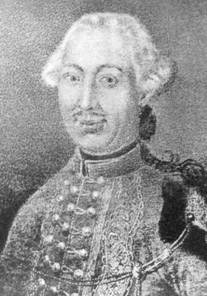
- Born: 11 April 1714; Versin, Province of Pomerania, Prussia (Wierszyno, Poland)
- Died: 12 August 1759 (aged 45); Kunersdorf, Neumark, Prussia (Kunowice) †
- Military career
- Allegiance: (Kingdom of Prussia) Prussia
- Branch: Army
- Service years: 1741–1759
- Rank: Major General
- Conflicts: War of Polish Succession; War of Austrian Succession; Seven Years' War
- Awards: Order of the Black Eagle; Equestrian statue of Frederick the Great

Georg Ludwig von Puttkamer (11 April 1715, Versin – 12 August 1759 at Kunersdorf) was a Prussian major general and squire of Pawonków and Pietrowice in Upper Silesia; he came from the Pomeranian noble family of Puttkamer.

== Family ==
Georg Ludwig von Puttkamer was the third son of the landowner of Versin and Viartlum, Andreas Joachim von Puttkamer (12 September 1665 in Versin — 14 June 1721 in Klein Volz) and Margarethe Dorothee von Below (10 October 1684 in Klein Machmin – 11 or 12 August 1755 in Versin). Georg Ludwig had seven sisters and three brothers, of whom one brother and four sisters died very young. He married Luise von Weissenfels and had two daughters and two sons, one of whom died very young. Puttkamer was first taught by a house tutor and attended the Gymnasium in Danzig (Gdańsk). He was sent there to be with a cousin but he had already gone to the University of Königsberg. The sixteen-year-old Georg Ludwig set off to Königsberg, to find his cousin and on the way he met a recruiter for the Prussian army, who persuaded him to become an officer. He joined Cuirassier Regiment no. 4. In 1740 under the new King Frederick II of Prussia, he became the oldest lieutenant at the Hussars Regiment No. 3 (Köhler).

== Military service ==
In August 1741 he defended Kloster Leubus (Lubiąż Abbey), when the regiment was attacked by the Austrians. Before his regiment was overwhelmed, he fled to a small island in the Oder, where he was captured by the Austrians and taken to Olmouck. He was exchanged and appointed commander of a squadron. With this he could continue to prove himself in the campaign.

In 1744 he fought under generals Marwitz, Heinrich Karl Ludwig de Herault and Nassau in Silesia. At Plesse, he was able to take many prisoners, as well as 300 horses and supplies. In 1745 he fought under Leopold von Anhalt-Dessau in Upper Silesia. The hussars bore the chief burden of the fighting. Under Hans Karl von Winterfeldt, on 6 February 1745, he expelled the Pandours from Torgau. He helped to secure the Duchy of Ratibor in 1745. Then he covered the Siege of Cosel. He was severely injured at Oderberg by a dragoon from the Regiment Lichtenstein. On 17 October 1745, he became a major; at the end of the campaign he was back under the command of General Nassau. During the ensuing peace he occupied himself with training his hussars and the King sent cavalry officers to Puttkamer to learn from him. In 1755 he became a colonel and commander of the White Hussars Regiment (renamed "Puttkamer-Hussars").

=== Seven Years' War ===
With the outbreak of the Seven Years' War in 1756, he was able to take over the city of Görlitz. In 1757 he joined the army of the Duke of Bevern. He participated in the Prussian victory at the Battle of Reichenberg. At the Battle of Prague, he fought on the left wing, pursuing the enemy as far as Gąsawa. On June 18 he fought in the Battle of Kolin. He was present at the Battle of Leuthen at which his Hussars delivered a decisive blow against the Austrian flank. At the end of the year, he became seriously ill but recovered. In the beginning of 1758, he became major general and received a pension of 1,500 thaler.

Together with General Moritz Franz Kasimir von Wobersnow, he went to Poland to destroy Russian magazines. On 12 August 1759 he fell in the Battle of Kunersdorf. His body was taken to Küstrin and buried there. His name is included on the Equestrian statue of Frederick the Great in Berlin, which was created by Christian Daniel Rauch.

== Sources ==
=== Sources ===
- Ellinor von Puttkamer (editor): Geschichte des Geschlechts v. Puttkamer (= Deutsches Familienarchiv, Band 83–85). 2. Auflage, Degener, Neustadt an der Aisch 1984, ISBN 3-7686-5064-2, S. 354 und 376–377
- Karl Friedrich Pauli: Leben grosser Helden des gegenwärtigen Krieges. Band 5, 1760, S. 93ff., Digitalisat
- Anton Balthasar König: Georg Ludwig von Puttkamer. In: Biographisches Lexikon aller Helden und Militairpersonen, welche sich in Preußischen Diensten berühmt gemacht haben. Band 3. Arnold Wever, Berlin 1790, S. 241 (Georg Ludwig von Puttkamer bei Wikisource [PDF]).
