= Wierszyno =

- Village
- Location within Poland
- Coordinates: 54°16′36″N 17°12′46″E
- Country: Poland
- Voivodeship: Pomeranian
- County: Bytów
- Gmina: Kołczygłowy
- Population: 189
- Time zone: UTC+1 (CET)
  - Summer (DST): UTC+2 (CEST)
- Postal code: 77-140
- ISO 3166 code: POL

Wierszyno [vjɛrˈʂɨnɔ] (German: Versin) is a village in the administrative district of Gmina Kołczygłowy, within Bytów County, Pomeranian Voivodeship, in northern Poland.

For details of the history of the region, see History of Pomerania.

== Notable residents ==
- Georg Ludwig von Puttkamer (1714-1759), general
