= Swienca family =

Sea-griffin coat of arms, used by Swienca family

The Swienca family was a medieval Pomeranian noble family which held high offices under various political powers in the Słupsk and Sławno Land and Gdańsk Pomerania from the mid-13th to the mid-14th centuries.

== History ==
It is named after its founder, Swienca or Swieca (Polish Święca, German Swenzo; referred to as Swenzo, Swenso or Suenzo in contemporary documents), the elder of two brothers.

In Gdańsk Pomerania, the Swiencas were transiently the most powerful family after the dukes. In the Lands of Sławno and Słupsk, the region in Farther Pomerania between river Unieść in the West and the river Łeba in the East, the border to Pomerelia, they ruled de facto autonomously under various dynasties until finally the sons of Wartislaw IV of Pomerania-Wolgast of the House of Pomerania made use of their rights as legal sovereigns of the Lands of Schlawe and Stolp and limited the power of the Swienca family considerably.

The Puttkamer family considers them to be their first documented ancestors. However, historians are divided on this issue.

== Ancestry ==
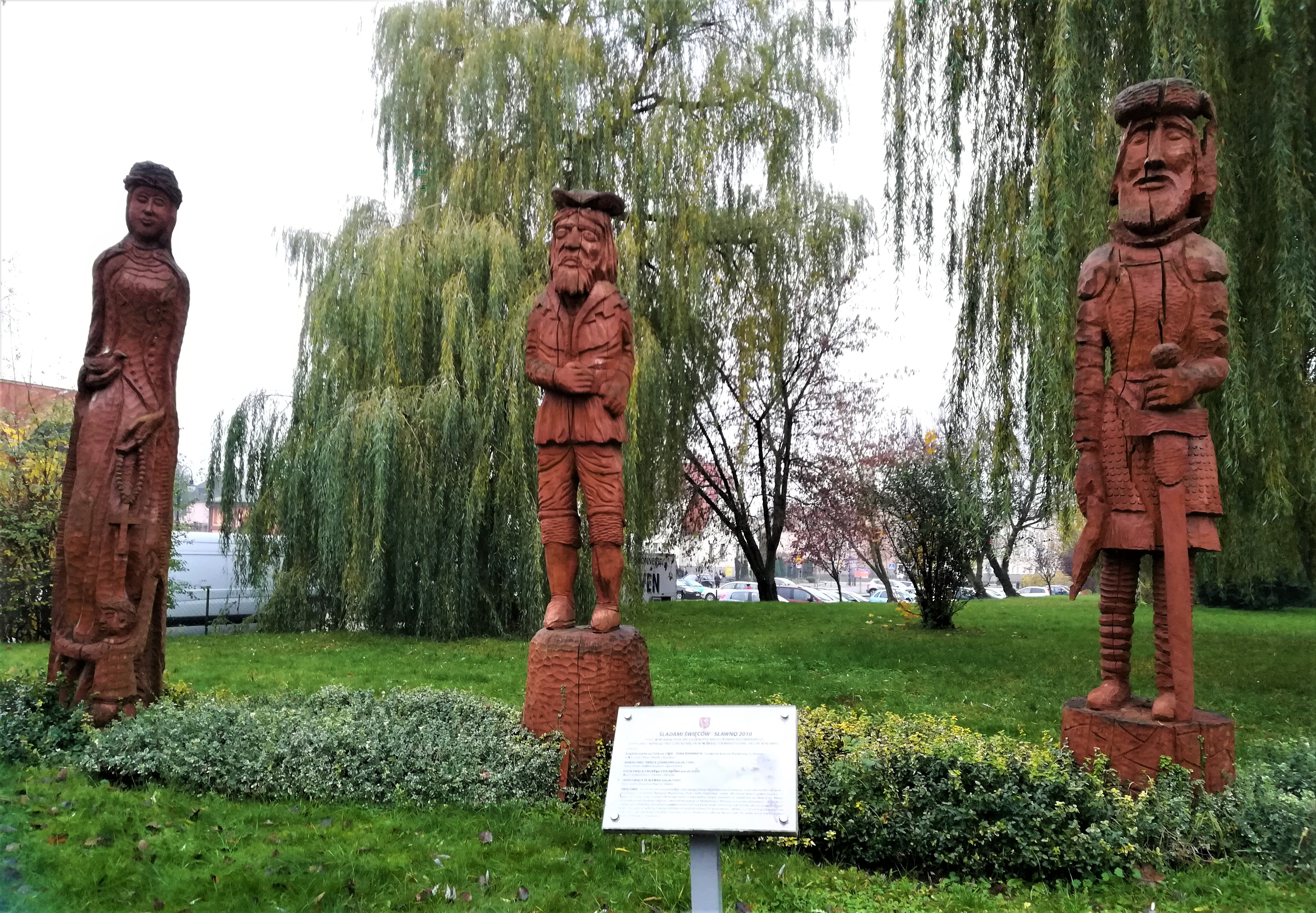
Wooden sculptures of members of the Swienca family: Sophie, Lawrence of Darłowo, Peter of Nowe

1. Święca, palatine and wójt of Pomerelia
  1. Peter I of Nowe, "chancellor" and "capitaneus" of Pomerelia, Lord of Nowe
    1. Peter II of Nowe, Lord of Tuchola
  2. John I (Jasco or Jesco, Polish: Jaśko) of Sławno, since 1308 Lord of Sławno
    1. Peter III of Sławno
    2. Lawrence (Polish: Warzyniec) III of Sławno
  3. Lawrence I of Darłowo, Lord of Nowe, since 1308 Lord of Darłowo
    1. John (Jasco) II of Darłowo
    2. Nathalie
2. Lawrence, castellan of Słupsk
  1. Święca junior
    1. Lawrence II
  2. Casimir (Polish: Kazimierz) of Tuchola

== Coat of arms ==
The escutcheon of the Swienca family consisted of a griffin the lower half of the body of which is replaced by a sturgeon's tail, a type of arms known in heraldry as a fish griffin. The fish griffin appears also in the escutcheons of the town of Darłowo.
