= Puttkamer =

German noble family

- Coat of arms of the Puttkamer family
- Parent family: Swienca family
- Current region: Pomerania
- Origin: Schlawe (Sławno), Farther Pomerania
- Members: Karl-Jesko von Puttkamer, Jesco Carl Eugen von Puttkamer, Jesco von Puttkamer
- Traditions: The first name of "Jesco"

The Puttkamer family (also abbreviated to v. Puttkamer) is a widely extended German noble family whose earliest ancestor is first recorded between 1257 and 1260 in the Lands of Schlawe and Stolp, Farther Pomerania.

== History ==
The Puttkamer family considers Swienca family to be their first documented ancestors. However, despite using almost the same coat of arms, historians are divided on this issue.

While some of its branches have awarded with the title of Graf (count), others are entitled to the lesser Freiherr (baron). According to a widespread family tradition, many firstborn Puttkamer sons receive the first name of Jesco. The branch of the family moved in the 16th century to Livonia and from there to the Polish-Lithuanian Commonwealth.

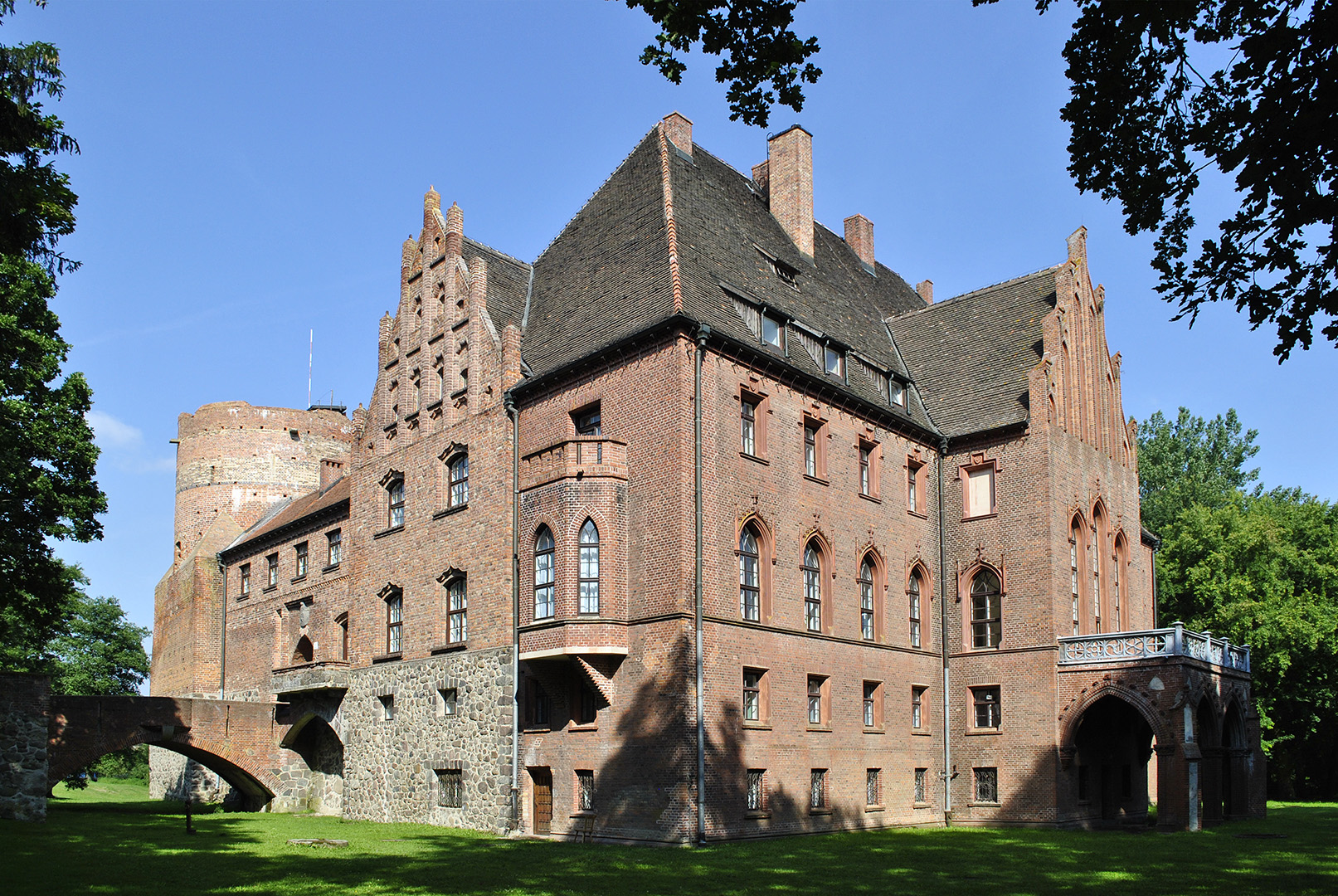
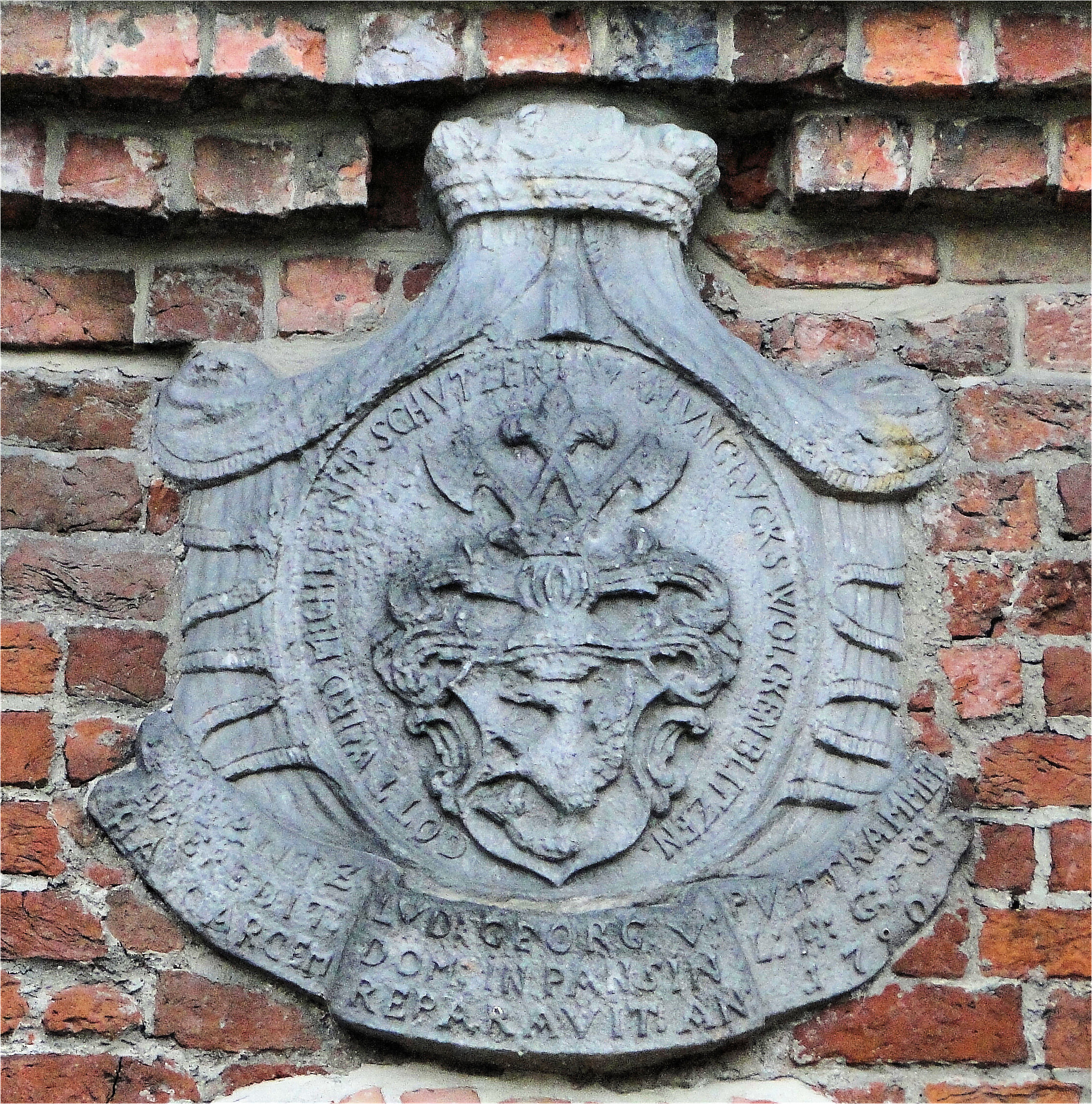
Pęzino Castle with a relief with the coat of arms of the family

== Persons ==
- Georg Ludwig von Puttkamer (1715–1759), Prussian general killed at Battle of Kunersdorf
- Gertrud von Puttkamer (1881–1944), German erotic writer
- Jacek Antoni Puttkamer (1740–1802), Polish-Lithuanian military officer, member of the Sejm of the Polish–Lithuanian Commonwealth, signer of the Constitution of 3 May 1791
- Jesco von Puttkamer (General) (1876-1959), German Generalleutnant.
- Jesco Carl Eugen von Puttkamer (1919–1987), Ambassador of the Federal Republic of Germany to Tel Aviv, Stockholm, Lisbon & Belgrade. He was Ambassador to Israel at the time of the 1972 killings at the Munich summer Olympics
- Jesco von Puttkamer (1933–2012), engineer and NASA manager
- Jesko von Puttkamer (1855–1917), German military chief and governor of German Cameroon from 1895 to 1907
- Johanna von Puttkamer (1824–1894), Prussian noblewoman, wife of Otto von Bismarck
- Karl-Jesko von Puttkamer (1900–1981), Rear Admiral and naval adjutant to Adolf Hitler
- Martin-Anton Freiherr von Puttkamer (1698–1782) Prussian Major-General
- Peter von Puttkamer (born 1962), documentary filmmaker
- Robert von Puttkamer (1828–1900), Prussian statesman
- Wawrzyniec Puttkamer (1794–1850), Polish nobleman

== Literature ==
- Otto Hupp: Münchener Kalender 1925. Verlagsanstalt München/Regensburg 1925.
- Ellinor von Puttkamer: Geschichte des Geschlechts von Puttkamer, Neustadt an der Aisch 1984, Deutsches Familienarchiv Band 83-85, ISBN 3-7686-5064-2
- Genealogisches Handbuch des Adels, Adelslexikon Band XI, Band 122 der Gesamtreihe, C. A. Starke Verlag, Limburg (Lahn) 2000, ISSN 0435-2408
