= Coat of arms of the West Pomeranian Voivodeship =

Polish coat of arms

- Armiger: Adam Rudawski, Voivode of the West Pomeranian Voivodeship
- Adopted: 23 October 2000
- Shield: White (silver) Iberian style escutcheon
- Compartment: Red griffin with yellow (golden) beak and claws
- Use: West Pomeranian Voivodeship

The coat of arms of the West Pomeranian Voivodeship, Poland depicts a red griffin with yellow (golden) beak and claws on a white (silver) background. The coat of arms was created by Jerzy Bąk and adopted in 2000.

== Design ==
The coat of arms consists of a red griffin with a yellow (golden) beak and claws standing in the combat position, within a white (silver) Iberian-style escutcheon.

The white colour is described in the hex triplet system as #FFFFFF, the red colour as #D22730, and the yellow as #F7D417.

Colour model	White	Red	Yellow
CMYK	0.0.0.0	0.81.77.18	0.14.90.3
RGB	(255,255,255)	(210,39,48)	(247,212,23)
Hex	#FFFFFF	#D22730	#F7D417

== History ==
The griffin is a traditional symbol of the West Pomerania, used since the 12th century. Between the 12th and 13th centuries, the griffin became the symbol of the House of Griffin that ruled in that area. Subsequently, the red griffin on the white background became the symbol of the Duchy of the Pomerania-Stettin. In the 1730s, the design had become the symbol of the entire West Pomerania.

The coat of arms of the West Pomeranian Voivodeship was designed by Jerzy Bąk. The design was based on the red griffin present on the banner used by the forces of Casimir V, duke of Pomerania-Stettin, during the Battle of Grunwald in 1410.

On 11 August 2000, the project was approved by the Heraldic Commission, and on 23 October 2000, adopted by the West Pomeranian Voivodeship Sejmik. The coat of arms is additionally present on the flag of the West Pomeranian Voivodeship.

== See also ==
- Flag of the West Pomeranian Voivodeship
- Coat of arms of Mecklenburg-Vorpommern
