= Flag of Mecklenburg =

Mecklenburg
- Proportion: 3:5
- Adopted: 26 March 1813 (original version); 1996 (current version)
- Design: Divided into blue, yellow, and red horizontal stripes

The flag that serves as the symbol of the historical and geographical region of the Mecklenburg is divided horizontally into two stripes: light blue on the top and white on the bottom. It originated as the flag of the Grand Duchy of Mecklenburg-Schwerin, adopted in 1813. Since 1996, it is officially recognized as the symbol of the historical region of Mecklenburg within Mecklenburg-Vorpommern, Germany.

== Design ==
The flag is a rectangle divided horizontally into three stripes, that are from top to bottom: dark blue, yellow, and red. The aspect ratio height to width ratio is equal 3:5.

== History ==
The flag of Mecklenburg, used between 1813 and 1952.

On 26 March 1813, from orders of grand duke Frederick Francis I, the Grand Duchy of Mecklenburg-Schwerin had adopted the flag which consisted of three horizontal stripes of equal width: blue, yellow, and red. The blue colour represented the historical Lordship of Rostock, the yellow colour, Mecklenburg, and the red colour, the historical County of Schwerin.

The civil ensign of the Grand Duchy of Mecklenburg-Schwerin.

On 24 March 1855, the Grand Duchy of Mecklenburg-Schwerin established its civil ensign, which consisted of three horizontal stripes of equal width: blue, white, and red. Such design had been used as the flag of the city of Rostock in Mecklenburg, since 14th century.

On 23 December 1863, the Grand Duchy of Mecklenburg-Schwerin adopted the flag protocol, confirming the blue-yellow-red flag, and on 4 4 January 1864, the Grand Duchy of Mecklenburg-Strelitz, did the same, adopting identical flag. Both states existed until 1918, when they were replaced by the Free State of Mecklenburg-Schwerin, and the Free State of Mecklenburg-Strelitz. In 1934, they were merged into the Gau Mecklenburg. The blue-yellow-blue flag remained in use until 1935, when Nazi Germany forbid its provinces from using their flags, ordering them to replace them with the national flag.

The flag was reestablished in 1947, as the symbol of the State of Mecklenburg, which existed until 1952.

The unofficial flag of the Mecklenburg-Vorpommern used in 1990.

The state of Mecklenburg-Vorpommern had been established in 1990, following the German reunification. In 1990, prior to the establishment of the official flag, the state unofficially used the historical flag of Mecklenburg. It was a rectangle divided horizontally into three equal stripes, that were, from top to bottom, dark blue, yellow, and red. In the centre was placed the historical coat of arms of Mecklenburg, in form of the black head of a bull in yellow crown with white horns, placed in the yellow escutcheon (shield). Such flag was hoisted in front of the Reichstag building in Berlin during the celebrations of the German Unity Day on 3 October 1990.

The flag of Mecklenburg-Vorpommern used since 1991.

The official current flag of the state had been adopted on 29 January 1991. It was designed by Norbert Buske. The civil flag consists of five horizontal stripes, that are from the top to bottom: blue (ultramarine), white, yellow, white, and red (vermilion). The proportions of the stripes are equal to 4:3:1:3:4. The aspect ratio of the flag height to its wight is equal 3:5. The colours are combined from the flags of two historical regions of the country, blue and white flag of Western Pomerania, and blue-yellow-red flag of Mecklenburg.

In 1996, the flag had been officially recognized as the symbol of the historical region of Mecklenburg within Mecklenburg-Vorpommern, Germany. The flag consists of three horizontal stripes of the equal wight: blue, yellow, and red. The aspect ratio of its height to its width is equal 3:5.

== See also ==
- Flag of Mecklenburg-Vorpommern
- Flag of Western Pomerania
