= Flag of Kashubia =

Flag of a region in Poland

- Use: De facto flag
- Adopted: 18 August 1929
- Design: Two black and yellow stripes

The flag that is used as the symbol of Kashubia, a region in Central Europe, and the Kashubian people, is divided horizontally into black and yellow stripes.

== Design ==
Second variant of the flag, inspired by the coat of arms.

There is no one universally recognized official description of the flag design. The most common version of the flag of Kashubia is divided horizontally into two equally-sized stripes that are black on top and yellow on the bottom. Notably, such design is officially recognized by the Kashubian Association. There are no official proportions of the flag's height and width.

The flags colours originate from the coat of arms of Kashubia. Alternatively, some theories state that the flag originates from the flag of the Habsburg monarchy.

The other version is a banner of arms, based on the coat of arms of Kashubia, that depicts a black griffin standing on its back paws, wearing a yellow crown, placed in the centre of the yellow background. The griffin is adopted from the coat of arms of Kashubia.

== History ==
The first recorded use of the flag dates back to 18 August 1929 during a Kashubian convention in Kartuzy. In the book Współczesna literatura kaszubska 1945-1980, the author Jan Drzeżdżon states that the griffin flag was the first to be shown, and the two-stripe flag was the second. He also mentions that Aleksander Majkowski owned such flag before the convention happened. The convention was the first event that saw the rise of the popularity of the flag. Following the hanging of the flag at the convention, the local government sent police officers to take it down. In order to prevent further escalation, the flag was hung next to the flag of Poland.

== Holiday ==
The Kashubian Flag Holiday (Kashubian: Swiãto Kaszëbsczi Fanë; Polish: Święto flagi kaszubskiej) happens on 18 August as the anniversary of the first time the Kashubian flag was displayed. The first celebration of said holiday happened in 2012 as an initiative of Kashubian Association.

== See also ==
- Coat of arms of Kashubia
- Flag of the Pomeranian Voivodeship
- Flag of Western Pomerania
