= Wawrzyniec Samp =

Sculptor

Wawrzyniec Samp (born 25 June 1939) is a Polish sculptor and graphic artist.

Samp was born in Danzig, Free City of Danzig (present-day Gdańsk, Poland). He graduated from the Academy of Fine Arts in Gdańsk in 1965, and now he has his own artistic study in the city. He specializes in Pomeranian-Kashubian, marine and sacral graphics.

== Projects ==
Coat of arms of the Pomeranian Voivodeship

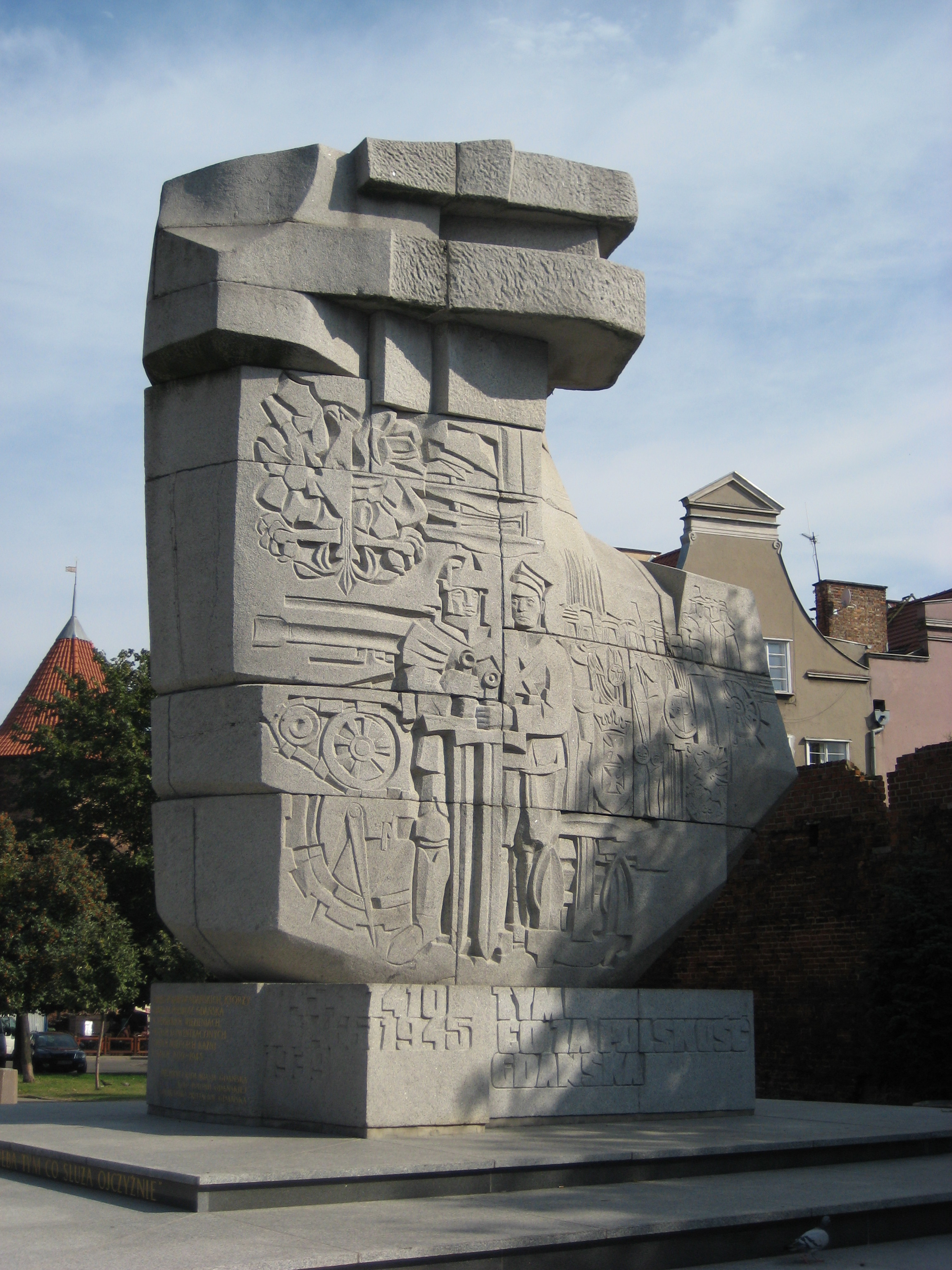
Monument to the Poles who died for the Gdansk Polishness in German prisons, concentration camps and other places of execution in 1939–1945.

His main projects include:

- monuments:
  - Tym co za polskośc Gdańska, Gdańsk
  - Czynu partyzanckiego kolejarzy, Czarna Woda
  - Józef Wybicki, Kościerzyna
  - Pope John Paul II, Gdynia
  - Stefan Wyszyński, Gniezno Cathedral
  - Świętopełk the Great Monument, Gdańsk
  - Izydor Gulgowski and Teodora Gulgowska, Wdzydze
  - Jerzy Popiełuszko, St. Brigid basilic in Gdańsk
- memorial plates:
  - Józef Wrycza, Wiele and Zblewo
  - bishop Konstantyn Dominik, Swarzewo
  - primate Stefan Wyszyński, Stoczek
  - Józef Wybicki, patron of a high-school in Gdańsk-Orunia
  - Loen Roppel, Luzino
  - Florian Ceynowa, Wejherowo hospital
  - Polish Kings Coronations, Gniezno cathedral
  - Pope John Paul II, Gdynia
  - Pope John Paul II, New Port in Gdańsk
  - bishop W. Pluta, Gorzów Wielkopolski
  - bishop Józef Drzazga, Olsztyn
  - Jozef Wilczek, Luzino
- medals and medallions:
  - 27 medals of Dukes of Pomerania
  - 650-years of NMP basilic in Gdańsk
  - Srebrna Tabakieta Abrahama
  - Cech Piekarzy i Cukierników in Gdańsk
  - 400-years of Gdańsk Library of PAN
  - 40-years of Kashubian-Pomeranian Association

Publications:

- L. Bądkowski, W. Samp, Poczet książąt Pomorza Gdańskiego, Gdańsk 1974

Awards:

- Medal Stolema, 1974
- Złoty Krzyż Zasługi
- Zasłuzonym Ziemi Gdańskiej
- Złoty Medal Prymasowski Zasłużony w posłudze dla Kościoła i Narodu
- Nadgoda Miasta Gdańska
