= List of banners in the Battle of Grunwald =

The following tables list the banners of the Lithuanian and Polish forces participating in the Battle of Grunwald in 1410.

== Poland ==
The exact Order of Battle of the Polish forces is unknown. However, Ioannes Longinus in his Historiæ Polonicæ written after 1455 recorded 51 Polish banners, together with their descriptions, blazoning and commanders.

Unfortunately, this list also has some obvious errors:

- at the time of the battle several of the banners attributed to Poland were constituents of the Lithuanian army (e.g. Lwów, Podolia, Halicz);
- Coat of Arms of Lithuania (Vytis) was a banner exclusively of the Grand Duchy of Lithuania;
- arrows, axes and horseshoes are typical to Lithuanian heraldry, but not the Polish one, etc...

It is not certain whether the list is complete.

Banner of	Battle sign	Blazon from Longinus' Historiae Polonicae	Origin	Remarks
=== Army of The Crown - Court Banners ===
Great Banner of Kraków and the Kingdom of Poland	Arms of Poland	Primum vexillum magnum Cracoviensis terrae, cuius alba aquila coronata, extensis alis, in campo rubeo		Elite troops, under Zyndram of Maszkowice
"Gończa" Court Banner	Goncza Coat of Arms	Secundum vexillum Goncza, cuius duae cruces caeruleae in campo caelestino		under Andrzej of Ochocice of Osorya
Coat of Arms of Lithuania Court Banner	Coat of Arms of Lithuania	Tertium Cubiculariorum, cuius vir armatus equo candido insidens, gladimque manu vibrant, in campo rubeo		under Andrzej Ciołek of Żelechów and Jan of Sprowa of Odrowąż
Saint George		Quartum Sancti Georgiu, habens crucem albam in campo rubeo		Bohemian and Moravian mercenaries, under Sokol and Zbyslavek
=== Army of The Crown - Regional Banners ===
Land of Poznań	Coat of Arms of Poznań	Quintum terrae Posnaniensis, albam aquilamin campo rubeo, non coronatam
Land of Sandomierz	Flag of Sandomierz	Sextium Sandomiriensis terrae, in quo pro una medierate tres barrae, seu tractus glauci, in campo rubeo, pro altera septem stellae, in campo caelestino
Land of Kalisz	Flag of Kalisz	Septimum Calissiense, caput bubali in skakorum tabula, diademate Regio ornatum, ex cuius naribus circulus rotundus pendebar
Land of Sieradz	Flag of Sieradz	Octavum terrae Siradiensis, in quo pro una medierate, medietas aquilae albae in campo rubeo, pro altera medietas leonis flammei in campo albo
Land of Lublin	Jeleń	Nonum terrae Lubliensis, ceruum cornibus extensis in campo rubeo
Land of Łęczyca	Flag of Łęczyca	Decimum terrae Lancitiensis, euius insigne media pars nigrae aquilae, media vero albi leonis picti, in campo caeruleo, capita habentes coronata
Land of Kuyavia	Coat of Arms of Cuyavia	Undecimuni terrae Cuiaviensis, in quo pro una inedietate aquilae nigrae in campo caeruleomedietas; pro altera medietas leonis albi in campo rubeo, capita coronata gestantes
Land of Lwów	Banner of Lwów	Duodecimum terrae Leopoliensis, leonem caeruleum per modum pertam conscendentem, in campo caelestino
Land of Wieluń	Flag of Wieluń	Tredecimum terrae Vielunensis, lineam niveam transversitate, in campo rubeo, proportionaliter locatam		Reinforced with mercenaries from Silesia
Land of Przemyśl	Flag of Przemyśl	Quartum decimum terrae Premisliensis, quod aquilam caeruleam, duo capita a se invicem proportionaliter aversa, in campo caelestino
Land of Dobrzyń	Coat of Arms of Dobrzyń	Quintum decimum terrae Dobrzinensis, faciem numanam senilem ad femur se portendentem, capite diademate coronato cornibus quoque exasperato, in campo caerulio
Land of Chełm	Coat of Arms of Chełm	Sextum decimum terrae Chelmensis, ursum album inter duas arbores consistentem in campo rubeo
Three banners of Podolia	Coat of Arms of Podolia	Decimum septinum, decumum octavum, & decimum nonum, terrae Podolia, ... faciem solarem, in rubeo campo		Split up due to large number of knights
Land of Halicz	Coat of Arms of Halicz	Vigesimum terrae Haliciensis, monedulam nigram in capite coronata, in campo albo
=== Army of The Crown - Masovian Banners ===
Two banners of Duke Siemowit IV of Masovia	Coat of Arms of Masovia		Masovia, mostly Płock area	Dukes of Masovia
Duke Janusz I of Masovia	own		Masovia, mostly Warsaw area	Dukes of Masovia
=== Army of The Crown - Personal Banners ===
Archbishop of Gniezno Mikołaj Kurowski	Śreniawa
Bishop of Poznań Wojciech Jastrzębiec	Jastrzębiec			under Jarand of Brudzewo
Castellan of Kraków Krystyn of Ostrów	Rawicz
Voivod of Kraków Jan of Tarnów	Leliwa
Voivod of Poznań Sędziwój of Ostroróg	Nałęcz
Voivod of Sandomierz Mikołaj of Michałowo	Poraj
Voivod of Sieradz Jakub of Koniecpol	Pobóg
Castellan of Śrem Iwo of Obiechów	Wieniawa
Voivod of Łęczyca Jan Ligęza	Półkozic
Castellan of Wojnice Andrzej of Tęczyn	Topór
Marshal of The Crown Zbigniew of Brzezie	Zadora
Chamberlain of Kraków Piotr Szafraniec	Starykoń
Castellan of Wiślica Klemens of Moskorzów	Piława
Castellan of Śrem and mayor of Greater Poland Wincenty of Granów	Leliwa
Dobko of Oleśnica	Dębno
Spytko of Tarnów	Leliwa
Lord High Steward of Kalisz Marcin of Sławsko	Zaremba
Dobrogost Świdwa of Szamotuły	Nałęcz
Krystyn of Koziegłowy	Lis
Master King's Cup-Bearer Jan Mężyk	Wadwicz
Deputy Chancellor of the Crown Mikołaj Trąba	Trąby
Mikołaj Kmita of Wiśnicz	Śreniawa
Gryf Clan	Gryf			Family of Gryf, under Zygmunt of Bobowa
Zaklika of Korzkiew	Syrokomla
Clan of Koźlerogi	Koźlerogi			Family, under Castellan of Wiślica Florian of Korytnica
Jan of Jičín Odrowaz	Benešovici		Moravia	Volunteers from Moravia, commanded by Jan Helm, the hejtman in the duty of aristocratic family of Kravaře
Steward of the Crown and starost of Lwów Gniewosz of Dalewice	Strzegomia		Czech lands	Only volunteers and mercenaries from Silesia, Bohemia and Moravia
Duke of Lithuania Sigismund Korybut	Coat of Arms of Lithuania

== Lithuania ==
The sole source on the banners from the Grand Duchy of Lithuania is Jan Długosz. He counted 40 banners on the right flank of the Polish–Lithuanian forces, 10 flying the Columns of Gediminas and 30 flying the Vytis. The flags varied in the colors of the background, horse and its harness. Długosz listed 18 lands that supplied the banners: Trakai, Vilnius, Hrodna, Kaunas, Lida, Medininkai (Varniai?), Smolensk, Polotsk, Vitebsk, Kiev, Pinsk, Navahrudak, Brest, Vawkavysk, Drohiczyn, Mielnik, Kremenets, Starodub. One land might have supplied more than one banner as evidenced by Smolensk which provided three banners. That is all information currently available from contemporary sources. However, it is unclear how complete or accurate Długosz's information is.

Historians pointed out several notable absences from the list, including the banners from Volhynia (Lutsk and Volodymyr) as well as Samogitia. It is unclear whether Medininkai mentioned by Długosz referred to Varniai in Samogitia or to Medininkai Castle near Vilnius. The absence of Samogitian forces could be explained by a diversionary maneuver: according to 27 June 1410 report from Königsberg, a Lithuanian force was attacking Skalva. Other historians argued that the Medininkai banner represented at least seven Samogitian banners based on the seven regions mentioned in the Treaty of Königsberg (1390). Długosz's list is also missing three banners from Moldavia and a Tatar contingent known from German sources. Historians stipulate that in addition to banners from territories there should have been banners presented by nobles, but Długosz mentioned only Sigismund Korybut whose banner he counted with Polish forces.

Some Belarusian historians attempted to divide the 40 banners by nationality to Lithuanian, Belarusian, Ukrainian, and Russian banners. However, such analysis is fundamentally flawed as it is impossible to determine how many banners each territory provided, how many men were in each banner, or what was the ethnic composition in each land. For example, Smolensk had rebelled against Vytautas in 1404 and 1408 and therefore it is unlikely that the three Smolensk banners included just local soldiers.

Historians express skepticism over the lack of heraldic diversity. Heraldic symbols of various lands, including of Trakai, Kyiv and Novogrudok, are known from contemporary sources, to have included the great seal of Vytautas. Historians suggest that perhaps the two heraldic flags represented gonfalons, e.g. the 10 banners of Columns of Gediminas represented forces from domains of Grand Duke Vytautas and the 30 banners of Vytis represented different territories.
