= Coat of arms of Kashubia =

Versions

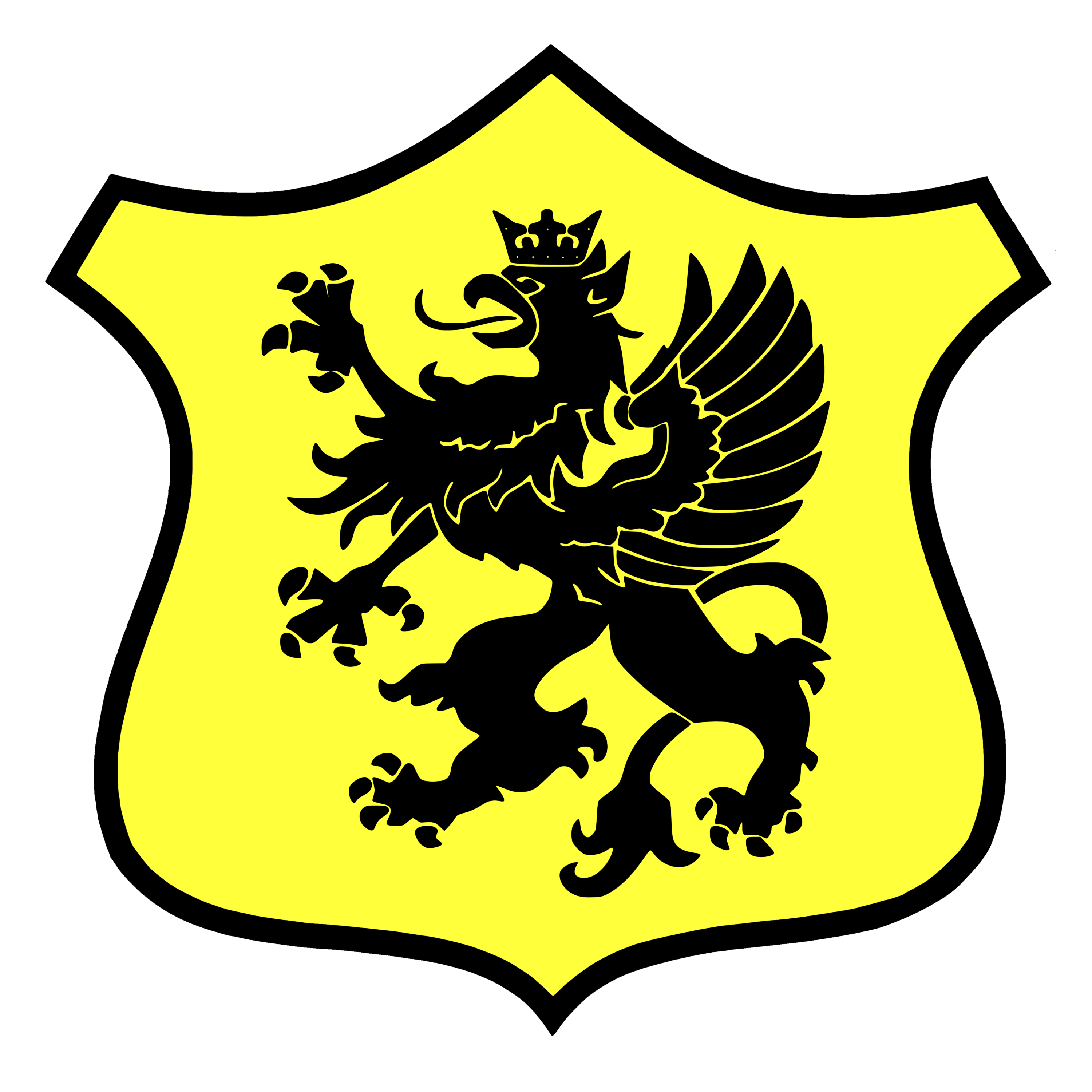

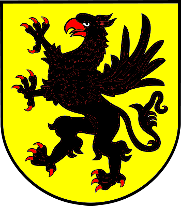
- Armiger: None
- Adopted: late 12th century
- Crest: None
- Shield: Or a Griffin sable
- Supporters: None
- Use: By ethnic organisations and schools

The coat of arms of Kashubia (Kashubian: pòznaka Kaszëb) is the coat of arms representing Kashubians. It usually is a black griffin with a crown on a yellow background, which is used to symbolise the House of Griffin.

== Versions ==
=== Kaszëbskô Jednota version ===
Kaszëbskô Jednota, the only major Kashubian organisation, presented the coat of arms as a black griffin facing right on a yellow background, claws, a beak and crown with a red tongue, a tail going behind the leg, and a black outline. It is used more often than any other versions.

=== Pomeranian Voivodeship version ===
The second version is the coat of arms of the Pomeranian Voivodeship, often used to represent Kashubia. It contains a black griffin with a red tongue on a yellow background without a crown facing towards the top right corner with a tail that splits into two and creates a specific pattern.

=== Black crown version ===
This version differs from the others in many aspects; Its outlines are different from all others. Its crown, beak, tongue, and claws are all black. The tail is similar to the first version.

=== Red beak version ===
The last version is a black griffin with red claws and a red beak (called an oręż) facing towards the front and the tail facing upwards, without a crown.

== History ==
The first use of the coat of arms dates back to the late 12th century, when the House of Griffin, rulers of the Duchy of Pomerania, used it as a seal. The Griffins called themselves dux Cassubiae, which stated that they were, indeed, Kashubians. A similar version of the griffin emblem was used on the flag of the Pomeranian Voivodeship during the Second Polish Republic that contained a red griffin on a silver background. The first use of the red-silver flag was recorded in 1466 by the duke of Pomerelia.

The yellow-black emblem was used by the Duchy of Kashubia, a part of the Duchy of Pomerania. It is shown in the emblem itself, which included the emblems of all Pomeranian duchies under its domain.

In most cases, dukes used the version without the crown. Aleksander Majkowski claimed to have seen a crowned griffin in Gryfia (currently Greifswald). The use of the crowned griffin was adapted into Kashubian culture over time. Newspapers played a major role in its rise in popularity, as vignettes often depicted such image. The newspapers that used it were: Zrzesz Kaszëbskô, Kaszëbë, Pomerania, Tatczëzna and Kaszëbskô Òdroda.

Another mention of the coat of arms was in Jan Rompsczi's poem:

To nasz znak – ten czôrny juńc;
Jesz Kaszëbów nie je kùńc!
Òn to straszny juńc i lew,
Òn z Mòrlawë dobéł krew!
Hej, të Grifie w blónë lec,
Chcemë cebie w sercach miec!
