= List of states in the Holy Roman Empire (P) =

This is a list of states in the Holy Roman Empire beginning with the letter P. Some historians mark the beginning of the Empire as 800, with the coronation of Frankish king Charlemagne ("Charles the Great").

Name	Type	Imperial circle	Imperial diet	History
Paderborn	Bishopric	Low Rhen	EC	799: Formed; 881: Granted territory in fief to Saxony; 1180: Made fief of the Archbishopric of Cologne; 1281: Imperial immediacy; HRE Prince of the Empire; 1802: To Prussia; 1807: To Westphalia; 1813: To Prussia
Palatinate (Kurpfalz); Count Palatine of the Rhine, Arch-Steward and Prince-Elector of the Holy Roman Empire	County Palatine; 1314: Duchy; 1356: Electorate	El Rhin	EL	915: Origins in County Palatine of Lotharingia; 945: County Palatine of Lorraine; 1095: County Palatine of the Rhine; 1214: Extinct; to Bavaria; 1255: To Upper Bavaria; 1314: Partitioned from Upper Bavaria; 1356: Electorate confirmed in the Golden Bull; 1410: Partitioned into itself, Palatinate-Neumarkt, Palatinate-Simmern-Zweibrücken and Palatinate-Mosbach; 1524: Appanage Palatinate-Neumarkt created 1556: Inherited by Palatinate-Neuburg; 1559: Inherited by Palatinate-Simmern; Neuburg to Palatinate-Zweibrücken; 1576: Partitioned into itself and Palatinate-Lautern; 1610: Partitioned into itself and Palatinate-Simmern-Kaiserslautern; 1621: Under imperial ban; occupied by the Emperor; 1623: Electoral title and Upper Palatinate to Bavaria; Parkstein, Peilstein and Weiden to Palatinate-Neuburg; 1648: Restored in the Lower Palatinate with new Electoral title 1685: Inherited by Palatinate-Zweibrücken-Neuburg; War of the Palatinian Succession; 1697: Acquired Megen; 1742: Inherited by Palatinate-Sulzbach; 1777: In personal union with Bavaria
Palatinate-Guttenberg	Duchy	Upp Rhen	PR	1592: Partitioned from Palatinate-Veldenz; 1611: Renamed to Palatinate-Guttenberg-Lützelstein
Palatinate-Guttenberg-Lützelstein	Duchy	Upp Rhen	PR	1611: Renamed from Palatinate-Guttenberg after inheritance of Palatinate-Lützelstein; 1654: Extinct; to Palatinate-Veldenz
Palatinate-Hilpoltstein	Duchy	n/a	n/a	1614: Appanage created within Palatinate-Zweibrücken-Neuburg; 1644: Extinct; to Palatinate-Zweibrücken-Neuburg
Palatinate-Lautern	Duchy	Upp Rhen	PR	1576: Partitioned from the Palatinate; 1592: Extinct; to the Palatinate; 1797: to France
Palatinate-Lützelstein	Duchy	Upp Rhen	PR	1592: Partitioned from Palatinate-Veldenz; 1611: Extinct; to Palatinate-Guttenberg
Palatinate-Mosbach	Duchy	n/a	n/a	1410: Partitioned from the Palatinate; 1448: Acquired Neumarkt; renamed to Palatinate-Mosbach-Neumarkt
Palatinate-Mosbach-Neumarkt	Duchy	n/a	n/a	1448: Renamed from Palatinate-Mosbach after acquisition of Palatinate-Neumarkt; 1499: Extinct; to the Palatinate
Palatinate-Neuburg	Duchy	Bav	PR	1505: Created for Otto Henry and Philip around Neuburg following the Landshut War of Succession; 1557: Sold to the Palatine Zweibrücken; 1569: Partitioned from Palatinate-Zweibrücken; 1609-14: War of the Jülich Succession against Brandenburg; 1614: Acquired Jülich and Berg; appanages Palatinate-Sulzbach and Palatinate-Hilpoltstein created 1656: Appanage Palatinate-Sulzbach granted independence 1685: Inherited the Palatinate and superseded
Palatinate-Neumarkt	Duchy	n/a	n/a	1410: Partitioned from the Palatinate; 1443: In personal union with Denmark, Norway and Sweden; 1448: Extinct; to Palatinate-Mosbach; 1524: Appanage created within the Palatinate; 1558: Extinct; to the Palatinate
Palatinate-Simmern	Duchy	Upp Rhen	PR	1410: Partitioned from Palatinate; 1444: Acquired Veldenz by marriage 1459: Partitioned with Palatinate-Zweibrücken; 1559: Inherited the Palatinate; Palatinate-Simmern-Sponheim to George following the house agreement for the succession of the Elector Palatine; outer lying territories passed to Palatinate-Zweibrücken; 1797: to France
Palatinate-Simmern-Kaiserslautern	Duchy	Upp Rhen	PR	1610: Partitioned from the Palatinate; 1674: Extinct; to the Palatinate
Palatinate-Simmern-Sponheim	Duchy	Upp Rhen	PR	1559: Core of Palatinate-Simmern to George; 1598: Extinct; to the Palatinate
Palatinate-Sulzbach	Duchy	Bav	n/a	1614: Appanage created within Palatinate-Zweibrücken-Neuburg; 1656: Imperial immediacy 1714: Acquired Parkstein and Weiden; 1732: Acquired Bergen op Zoom; 1742: Inherited and superseded by the Palatinate
Palatinate-Veldenz	Duchy	Upp Rhen	PR	1543: Partitioned from Palatinate-Zweibrücken; 1552: Acquired Remigiusland; 1553: Acquired Lützelstein, 1/2 of Guttenberg and 2/3 of Alsenz; 1592: Partitioned into itself, Palatinate-Lützelstein and Palatinate-Guttenberg; 1694: Extinct; divided between the Palatinate, Palatinate-Sulzbach and Palatinate-Zweibrücken-Birkenfeld
Palatinate-Zweibrücken	Duchy	Upp Rhen	PR	1444: Partitioned from Palatinate-Simmern; 1505: Acquired Kleeburg and half of Guttenberg; 1543: Partitioned into itself and Palatinate-Veldenz; 1559: Acquired Palatinate-Neuburg; 1569: Partitioned into Palatinate-Zweibrücken-Neuburg, Palatinate-Zweibrücken, Palatinate-Zweibrücken-Sulzbach, Palatinate-Zweibrücken-Vohenstrauss-Parkstein and Palatinate-Zweibrücken-Birkenfeld; 1604: Partitioned into Palatinate-Zweibrücken-Veldenz, Palatinate-Zweibrücken-Landsberg and Palatinate-Zweibrücken-Kleeberg; 1733: Reunited by Palatinate-Zweibrücken-Birkenfeld-Bischweiler; 1793: To France; 1799: Inherited and superseded by Bavaria-Palatinate
Palatinate-Zweibrücken-Birkenfeld	Duchy	Bav	n/a	1569: Partitioned from Palatinate-Zweibrücken; 1616: Acquired portion of Sponheim; 1630: Sideline Palatinate-Zweibrücken-Birkenfeld-Bischweiler created 1671: Extinct; to Palatinate-Zweibrücken-Birkenfeld-Bischweiler
Palatinate-Zweibrücken-Birkenfeld-Bischweiler	Duchy	Bav	n/a	1630: Created when Christian I of Palatinate-Zweibrücken-Birkenfeld acquired Bischweiler; 1673: Acquired Rappoltstein; 1681: Partitioned into itself and Palatinate-Zweibrücken-Birkenfeld-Gelnhausen; 1733: Renamed to Palatinate-Zweibrücken
Palatinate-Zweibrücken-Birkenfeld-Gelnhausen	Duchy	Bav	n/a	1681: Partitioned from Palatinate-Zweibrücken-Birkenfeld-Bischweiler; 1789: To France; 1799: Received title Duke in Bavaria
Palatinate-Zweibrücken-Kleeberg	Duchy	Upp Rhen	n/a	1604: Partitioned from Palatinate-Zweibrücken; 1654: Inherited Sweden; Kleeberg passed to Adolph John I 1681: Became main of Palatinate-Zweibrücken; 1731: Extinct; to Palatinate-Birkenfeld-Bischweiler
Palatinate-Zweibrücken-Landsberg	Duchy	Upp Rhen	n/a	1604: Partitioned from Palatinate-Zweibrücken; 1661: Became main of Palatinate-Zweibrücken
Palatinate-Zweibrücken-Sulzbach	Duchy	Bav	n/a	1569: Partitioned from Palatinate-Zweibrücken; 1604: Extinct; to Palatinate-Zweibrücken-Neuburg
Palatinate-Zweibrücken-Veldenz	Duchy	Upp Rhen	n/a	1604: Partitioned from Palatinate-Zweibrücken-Zweibrücken; 1661: Extinct; to Palatinate-Zweibrücken-Landsberg
Palatinate-Zweibrücken-Vohenstrauss-Parkstein	Duchy	Bav	n/a	1569: Partitioned from Palatinate-Zweibrücken; 1597: Extinct; to Palatinate-Zweibrücken-Neuburg
Pappenheim; HRE Count & Lord of Pappenheim	Lordship; 1628: County	n/a	n/a	1111: First mentioned; Hereditary Marshall of the Holy Roman Empire; 1279: Partitioned into itself and Biberbach; 1356: Hereditary Arch-Marshall of the Holy Roman Empire; 1423: Acquired Schweinspoint; 1438: Acquired Gräfenthal; 1444: Partitioned into Pappenheim-Allgäu, Pappenheim-Gräfenthal, Pappenheim-Treuchtlingen and Pappenheim-Alesheim; Pappenheim itself shared between all lines and led by the most senior ruling lord 1628: HRE Count; senior agnate of the house granted the title of Count; 1697: Superseded Pappenheim-Alesheim; 1807: To Bavaria
Pappenheim-Alesheim	Lordship	n/a	n/a	1444: Partitioned from Pappenheim; 1697: Superseded by Pappenheim with the extinction of all other lines
Pappenheim-Allgäu	Lordship	n/a	n/a	1444: Partitioned from Pappenheim; 1494: Partitioned into Pappenheim-Grönenbach and Pappenheim-Rothenstein
Pappenheim-Biberbach; See: Biberbach				
Pappenheim-Gräfenthal	Lordship	n/a	n/a	1444: Partitioned from Pappenheim; 1599: Extinct; divided between Pappenheim-Grönenbach and Pappenheim-Stühlingen
Pappenheim-Grönenbach	Lordship	n/a	n/a	1494: Partitioned from Pappenheim-Allgäu; 1584: Side line Pappenheim-Stühlingen created 1619: Extinct; to Pappenheim-Stühlingen
Pappenheim-Rechberg	Lordship	n/a	n/a	1197: Hildebrand of Rechberg named as Marshall by marriage 1226: Title relinquished at death
Pappenheim-Rothenstein	Lordship	n/a	n/a	1494: Partitioned from Pappenheim-Allgäu; 1616: Extinct; to Fugger-Kirchheim
Pappenheim-Schwindegg	Lordship	n/a	n/a	1529: Partitioned from Pappenheim-Treuchtlingen; 1568: Inherited and renamed to Pappenheim-Treuchtlingen
Pappenheim-Stühlingen	County	Swab	SC	1584: Created when Conrad of Pappenheim-Grönenbach acquired Stühlingen; 1613: Sold rights around St. Blaise's Abbey; 1621: Sold Gräfenthal to Saxe-Altenburg; 1639: Extinct; to Fürstenberg-Stühlingen
Pappenheim-Treuchtlingen	Lordship	n/a	n/a	1444: Partitioned from Pappenheim; 1529: Partitioned into itself and Pappenheim-Schwindegg; 1568: Inherited by and renamed from Pappenheim-Schwindegg; 1591: Sold Schwindegg to Haunsperg; 1647: Extinct; to Brandenburg-Ansbach
Parchim(-Richenberg)	Principality	n/a	n/a	1226: Partitioned from Mecklenburg; 1255: Divided between Mecklenburg, Schwerin and Werle; 1256: Obtained Białogard as fief of Pomerania; 1270: Renounced claims to Parchim-Richenberg
Parkstein	Barony; 1776: County	Upp Rhen	WE	1762: Karoline Franziska Dorothea, illegitimate daughter of Charles Theodore of Bavaria-Palatinate legitimised; granted Parkstein; 1776: HRE Countess; 1777: Purchased portion of Reipoltskirchen; Parkstein to Bavaria; 1795: To France; 1818: Extinct
Passau	Bishopric	Bav	EC	737: Formed; 999: Imperial immediacy 1193: HRE Prince of the Empire; 1803: Divided between Bavaria and Salzburg; 1805: All to Bavaria
Passavant	Lordship	n/a	n/a	Originally to lords of Montfaucon; 1372: To Montbéliard; 1444: To Württemberg; 1678: To France
Petershausen	Abbacy	Swab	SP	983: Formed; Early 13th Century: Imperial immediacy 1530: To the City of Constance; 1556: Restored; 1802: To Baden
Pettau (March of) – see: Mark an der Drau (AKA Mark/Grafschaft hinter dem Drauwald, Lower Carantanian March, marchia transsilvana)				
Pfäfers	Abbacy	Swab	SP	731: Formed; 1408: Imperial immediacy 1648: Left the empire as part of Switzerland
Pfullendorf	Imperial City	Swab	SW	1220: Free Imperial City; 1803: To Baden
Piombino	Principality	n/a	n/a	1399: Lordship; 1594: HRE Principality; 1801: To Etruria; 1809: To Tuscany
Pirmont; See: Pyrmont				
Platen-Hallermund	County	Low Rhen	WE	1704: Younger German line of the Platen family acquired Hallermund; 1709: Lower Rhenish-Westphalian Circle; 1807: To Westphalia; 1813: To Hanover
Plauen	Advocacy (Vogtei)	n/a	n/a	1244: Partitioned from Plauen and Gera; 1302: Partitioned into Plauen Elder Line and Plauen Younger Line
Plauen and Gera	Advocacy (Vogtei)	n/a	n/a	1209: Partitioned from Weida; 1240: Acquired Greiz and Reichenbach; 1244: Partitioned into Plauen and Gera
Plauen Elder Line	Advocacy (Vogtei)	n/a	n/a	1302: Partitioned from Plauen; 1348: Partitioned into Plauen-Mühltroff and Plauen-Plauen
Plauen-Mühltroff	Advocacy (Vogtei)	n/a	n/a	1348: Partitioned from Plauen Elder Line; 1363: Country lost to Meissen; 1380: Extinct
Plauen-Plauen	Advocacy (Vogtei)	n/a	n/a	1348: Partitioned from Plauen Elder Line; 1426: Acquired Burgraviate of Meissen; henceforth known as such
Plauen Younger Line	Advocacy (Vogtei)	n/a	n/a	1302: Partitioned from Plauen; 1309: Adopted name Reuss von Plauen
Plesse (Plessen)	Lordship	Upp Rhen	WT	1097: First mentioned; known as Höckelheim c. 1150: Assumed the name Plesse; fiefs of Paderborn c. 1170: Partitioned into Plesse Elder Line and Plesse Younger Line; 1284/8: Reunited by Plesse Younger Line; 1571: Extinct; to Hesse-Cassel
Plesse Elder Line	Lordship	n/a	n/a	c. 1170: Partitioned from Plesse; 1284/8: Extinct; to Plesse Younger Line
Plesse Younger Line	Lordship	n/a	n/a	c. 1170: Partitioned from Plesse; 1284/8: Renamed to Plesse
Plettenberg	Lordship	n/a	n/a	1187: First mentioned; fief of Cologne; Partitioned into numerous lines; the most important that of Lenhausen
Plettenberg-Lenhausen	Lordship; 1689: Barony; 1724: County	n/a	n/a	1474: Partitioned from Plettenberg-Bamenohl c. 1500: Partitioned into itself and Plettenberg-Stockum; 1689: HRE Baron; 1724: HRE Count; Side line Plettenberg-Wittem founded 1730: Extinct; to Plettenberg-Wittem
Plettenberg-Wittem; HRE Count of Plettenberg & Wittem	County	Low Rhen	WE	1724: Ferdinand of Plettenberg-Lenhausen purchased Wittem, assumed the name Plettenberg-Wittem; 1732: Lower Rhenish-Westphalian Circle, Bench of Counts of Westphalia; 1801: To France; 1803: Compensated with Mietingen and Sulmingen; 1806: To Württemberg
Pluwig	Lordship	n/a	n/a	Originally a property of de Ponte (von der Brücken); 1211: To the Cathedral Chapter of Trier; formed an immediate and circle-free lordship 1794: To France; 1814: To Prussia
Pomerania	Duchy	Upp Sax	PR	1046: First mentioned; tributary of the Empire; 1106: Partitioned into itself and Pomerelia; 1120-3: Made fief of Poland; 1156: Partitioned into Pomerania-Stettin and Pomerania-Demmin; 1264: Reunited by Pomerania-Stettin; 1295: Partitioned into Pomerania-Wolgast and Pomerania-Stettin; 1478: Reunited by Pomerania-Wolgast; 1493: Imperial immediacy 1532: Partitioned into Pomerania-Wolgast and Pomerania-Stettin; 1625: Reunited by Pomerania-Stettin; 1634: Abdicated; under Imperial, Brandenburgian and Swedish occupation 1637: Extinct; 1648: Divided into Swedish Pomerania and Prussian Pomerania
Pomerania-Barth	Duchy	n/a	n/a	1377: Partitioned from Pomerania-Wolgast; 1393: Inherited and renamed to Pomerania-Wolgast; 1458: Partitioned from Pomerania-Wolgast; 1478: Extinct; to Pomerania-Wolgast; 1569: Appanage created within Pomerania-Wolgast; 1618: Inherited Pomerania-Stettin; appanage abolished
Pomerania-Demmin	Duchy	n/a	n/a	1156: Partitioned from Pomerania; 1164: Made fief of Saxony; acquired 1/3 of Wolgast; 1180: Extinct; to Pomerania-Stettin; 1187: Partitioned from Pomerania-Stettin; fief of Denmark; 1234: Rejoined the Empire; 1236: Lost Circipania to Mecklenburg-Rostock; made fief of Brandenburg; 1264: Extinct; to Pomerania-Stettin
Pomerania-Neustetten	Duchy	n/a	n/a	1372: Partitioned from Pomerania-Wolgast; 1390: Extinct; to Pomerania-Stolp
Pomerania-Rügenwalde	Duchy	n/a	n/a	1440: Created for Eric, former king of Denmark, Norway and Sweden; 1446: Inherited and renamed to Pomerania-Stolp; 1569: Appanage created within Pomerania-Stettin for Barnim X 1600: Inherited Pomerania-Stettin; appanage to Casimir VI; 1605: Extinct; to Pomerania-Barth; 1606: Appanage invested upon Bogislaw XIV and George II; 1620: Inherited Pomerania-Stettin; appanage abolished
Pomerania-Stargard	Duchy	n/a	n/a	1377: Partitioned from Pomerania-Stolp; 1395: Inherited and renamed to Pomerania-Stolp
Pomerania-Stettin	Duchy	Upp Sax	PR	1156: Partitioned from Pomerania; 1180: Imperial immediacy; acquired Pomerania-Demmin; 1185: Made fief of Denmark; 1187: Partitioned into itself and Pomerania-Demmin; 1227: Rejoined the Empire; 1231: Made fief of Brandenburg; 1264: Renamed to Pomerania; 1295: Partitioned from Pomerania; fief of Brandenburg; 1348: Imperial immediacy 1463: Acquired Pomerania-Stargard; 1464: Extinct; Stettin War of Succession between Pomerania-Wolgast and Brandenburg; 1472: To Pomerania-Wolgast; 1532: Partitioned from Pomerania; 1569: Abdicated; to John Frederick of Pomerania-Wolgast; 1600: Inherited and title assumed by Pomerania-Rügenwalde; 1603: Extinct; to Philip II of Pomerania-Barth; 1618: Inherited by appanage Pomerania-Barth; 1620: Inherited by appanage Pomerania-Rügenwalde; 1625: Renamed to Pomerania
Pomerania-Stolp	Duchy	n/a	n/a	1372: Partitioned from Pomerania-Wolgast; 1377: Partitioned into itself and Pomerania-Stargard; 1395: Inherited by Pomerania-Stargard; 1446: Inherited by Pomerania-Rügenwalde; 1459: Extinct; to Pomerania-Wolgast
Pomerania-Wolgast	Duchy	Upp Sax	n/a	1295: Partitioned from Pomerania; fief of Brandenburg; 1317: Acquired Schlawe and Stolp; 1325: War of the Rügen Succession against Mecklenburg; 1328: Acquired Rügen; 1348: Imperial immediacy 1372: Partitioned into Pomerania-Stolp, itself and Pomerania-Neustettin; 1377: Partitioned into Pomerania-Barth and itself 1393: Extinct; to Pomerania-Barth who assumed the title 1425: Partitioned into Pomerania-Wolgast-Wolgast, Pomerania-Wolgast-Demmin and Pomerania-Wolgast-Barth; 1451: Reunited by Pomerania-Wolgast-Wolgast; 1455: Acquired Lauenburg and Bütow; 1458: Partitioned into itself and Pomerania-Barth; 1459: Acquired Pomerania-Stolp and Pomerania-Rügenwalde; 1472: Acquired Pomerania-Stettin; made fief of Brandenburg; 1478: Renamed to Pomerania; 1532: Partitioned from Pomerania; 1569: Repartition of Pomerania; partitioned into Pomerania-Stettin, Pomerania-Barth, Pomerania-Wolgast and Pomerania-Rügenwalde; 1625: Extinct; to Pomerania-Stettin
Pomerania-Wolgast-Barth	Duchy	n/a	n/a	1425: Partitioned from Pomerania-Wolgast; 1435: Partitioned into itself and Pomerania-Wolgast-Stralsund; 1451: Extinct; to Pomerania-Wolgast-Wolgast
Pomerania-Wolgast-Demmin	Duchy	n/a	n/a	1425: Partitioned from Pomerania-Wolgast; 1450: Extinct; to Pomerania-Wolgast-Wolgast
Pomerania-Wolgast-Stralsund	Duchy	n/a	n/a	1435: Partitioned from Pomerania-Wolgast-Barth; 1440: Extinct; to Pomerania-Wolgast-Barth
Pomerania-Wolgast-Wolgast	Duchy	n/a	n/a	1425: Partitioned from Pomerania-Wolgast; 1451: Renamed to Pomerania-Wolgast
Provence	Duchy; 877: County; 933: Margraviate; 1037: County	n/a	n/a	5th Century: Duchy within the Kingdom of Burgundy; 877: County of Provence to Boso within Western Francia; 879: Boso made king of Lower Burgundy; 933: To the Kingdom of Arles; given as fief to Hugh the Black; 1032: Made fief of the Empire; 1125: Partitioned into itself (as County) and a margraviate; see below 1127: To the House of Barcelona by marriage 1267: To the House of Anjou by marriage 1481: In personal union with France; 1486: To France
Provence	Margraviate	n/a	n/a	1125: Provence partitioned; north formed as a Margraviate for the claim of Alphonse I of Toulouse; 1271: Extinct; in personal union with France; 1274: Venaissin to the Papal States; 1486: To France
Prüm (Prum; Pruem)	Abbacy	Upp Rhen	EC	721: Established; 1222: HRE Prince of the Empire; 1574: To Trier; 1801: To France; 1815: To Prussia
Pückler and Limpurg	County	Franc	FR	1737: Renamed from Pückler when inherited a portion of Limpurg through marriage to Caroline Christiana of Löwenstein-Wertheim; 1787: Acquired part of Limpurg-Sontheim and Limpurg-Gaildorf through marriage to Waldeck-Limpurg; 1806: To Württemberg
Prussia	Duchy; 1701: Kingdom	n/a	n/a	Whilst not part of the empire, Prussia became a de facto state of the empire and possessed extensive territories within the Empire
Pyrmont (in Lower Saxony)	County	Low Rhen	WF	1180: Established by Cologne; given as fief to Schwalenberg; 1194: Partitioned from Schwalenberg; 1494: Extinct; to Spiegelberg; 1568: To Lippe-Spiegelberg-Pyrmont; 1583: To Gleichen-Tonna; 1625: To Waldeck-Eisenberg; 1668: Ceded Lügde to Paderborn; 1711: To Waldeck and Pyrmont; 1805: Partitioned from Waldeck and Pyrmont; 1812: Extinct; to Waldeck and Pyrmont
Pyrmont (Pirmont; in Eifel)	Lordship; 15th Century: Barony	Low Rhen	WF	12th Century: First mentioned; to Schönburg early 13th Century: Schönburg assumed the name Pyrmont; Before 1400: Acquired 2/3 of Ehrenburg by marriage 1426: Acquired remainder of Ehrenburg; 15th Century: HRE Baron; 1526: Extinct; to Eltz; 1652: Half to Waldbott von Bassenheim; 1695: Eltz half to Trier; 1710: All to Waldbott von Bassenheim; 1789: To France; 1815: To Prussia
