= Pappenheim-Alesheim =

State of the Holy Roman Empire

Coordinates: 49°03′N 10°52′E

Pappenheim-Alesheim Pappenheim-Alesheim
- 1444–1697
- Coat of arms
- Status: State of the Holy Roman Empire
- Capital: Alesheim
- Common languages: German
- Religion: Roman Catholic; Lutheran 1562
- Government: Feudal monarchy
- Lord
- Historical era: Middle Ages
  - Partitioned from Pappenheim: 1444
  - Formation of Catholic and Evangelical lines: 1628
  - Superseded by Pappenheim: 1697
Preceded by	Succeeded by
Pappenheim	Pappenheim
- Today part of: Germany

Pappenheim-Alesheim (sometimes Pappenheim-Alzheim) was a statelet in the Holy Roman Empire that existed from 1444 until 1697.

== History ==
Alesheim was first mentioned in 1214 and was part of the territories of the Prince-Bishopric of Eichstätt. The House of Pappenheim exercised the low jurisdiction in Alesheim and some neighbouring districts.

In 1444 the heirs of Haupt II, Marshall of Pappenheim partitioned the family's holdings between themselves. Alesheim and its surrounds passed to Sigmund II, Haupt's youngest son. The core hereditary lands of the family were ruled jointly by all branches, and the office of the Imperial Marshall of the Holy Roman Empire was held by the family's most senior agnate.

Like the other branches of the Pappenheim family, Pappenheim-Alesheim converted to the Lutheran faith in the middle of the 16th Century.

In 1628 Philip was made an Imperial Count for services rendered during the Thirty Years' War. Philip died without descendants in 1651. His distant cousin Wolfgang Philip had converted to Roman Catholicism shortly prior to his death, and in 1652 was recognised by the Emperor with the Imperial Count title. This Catholic line would die with his son Louis Francis in 1697. Meanwhile, the rest of the family remained evangelical.

In 1647 the Pappenheim-Alesheim line became the last remaining branch of the Pappenheim family following the extinction of the Treuchtlingen line, and the Evangelical line became the last following the extinction of the Catholic line in 1697.

== Heads of state ==
=== Lords of Pappenheim-Alesheim (1444 – 1628) ===
- Sigmund II (1444–1496)
- Sigmund III (1496–1536)
- Christopher (1536–1562)
- Sigmund IV (1536–1554)
- Thomas I (1536–1552)
- Haupt III (1536–1559)
- Henry Burchard (1552–1612)
- Thomas II (1552–1568)
- Haupt IV (1559–1571)
- Guy Hypolitus (1559–1621)
- Philip Thomas Posthumus (1569–1634)
- George Philip (1621–1622)
- Caspar Gottfried (1634–1651)

=== Counts of Pappenheim-Alesheim Catholic Line ===
- Philip (1634–1651); Imperial Count of Pappenheim 1628–1651
- Wolfgang Philip (1652(22)–1671)
- Charles Philip Gustav (1671–1692)
- Louis Francis (1692–1697)

=== Lords of Pappenheim-Alesheim Evangelical Line ===
- Francis Christopher (1622–1678)
- Wolfgang Christopher (1678–1685)
- Christian Ernest (1685–1721), Marshall of Pappenheim 1697
