= Pappenheim-Treuchtlingen =

Holy Roman statelet

Coordinates: 49°03′N 10°52′E

Pappenheim-Treuchtlingen Pappenheim-Treuchtlingen
- 1444–1647
- Coat of arms
- Status: State of the Holy Roman Empire
- Capital: Treuchtlingen
- Common languages: German
- Religion: Roman Catholic; Lutheran 1559; Roman Catholic 1614
- Government: Feudal monarchy
- Lord
- Historical era: Middle Ages
  - Partitioned from Pappenheim: 1444
  - Side line Pappenheim-Schwindegg established: 1518
  - Extinct; inherited by Pappenheim-Schwindegg: 1568
  - Imperial County: 1628
  - Extinct: 1647
| Preceded by | Succeeded by |
| Pappenheim | Brandenburg-Ansbach |
- Today part of: Germany

Pappenheim-Treuchtlingen was a statelet in the Holy Roman Empire that existed from 1444 until 1647.

== History ==
Treuchtlingen was first mentioned in 1095. By the 13th Century a local line of lords rose in the region, as fiefs of the Burgraves of Nuremberg and later the Margraves of Brandenburg-Ansbach. The Treuchtlingen family died in 1422, and so the fiefs were divided between their heirs: the Seckendorff and Geyern families.

In 1444 the heirs of Haupt II, Marshall of Pappenheim partitioned the family's holdings between themselves. The surroundings of Treuchtlingen, some of them held as fiefs of the Teutonic Order at Ellingen, owned by the Pappenheims passed to George I, Haupt's sixth son. The core hereditary lands of the family were ruled jointly by all branches, and the office of the Imperial Marshal of the Holy Roman Empire was held by the family's most senior agnate. In 1447 George purchased Treuchtlingen castle from the Seckendorffs and made it his seat.

Pappenheim-Treuchtlingen converted to the Lutheran faith in 1559.

In 1518 Ulrich, the younger son of George II, inherited Schwindegg by marriage after the death of Jacob I of Fraunhofen, founding the line of Pappenheim-Schwindegg. The Schwindegg line inherited Treuchtlingen following the death of John George in 1568.

The most notable member of the Treuchtlingen line was Geoffrey Henry, who reigned 1600 – 1632. In 1614 he converted to Roman Catholicism. After the outbreak of the Thirty Years' War (1618–1648), he abandoned his diplomatic career and entered the army, serving as a lieutenant-colonel at Battle of White Mountain in 1620. After being promoted to a colonel and serving with the Spanish forces in Italy and the Grey Leagues, he was sent to suppress a rebellion in Upper Austria in 1626. He later served with Tilly against Denmark and Brunswick, but his attempts to obtain the Principality of Wolfenbüttel failed. In 1628 he was awarded the title of Imperial Count alongside his distant cousin Philip of the Pappenheim-Alesheim line. In 1631 he took part in the notorious Sack of Magdeburg. He died at the Battle of Lützen in 1632.

Geoffrey Henry was succeeded by his only child Wolfgang Adam. After his death in 1647, Treuchtlingen was reclaimed by the margraves of Brandenburg-Ansbach.

== Heads of state ==
=== Lords of Pappenheim-Treuchtlingen (1444 – 1628) ===
- George I (1444–1485)
- George II (1485–1529)
- Rudolph (1529–1552)
- John George (1552–1568)
- Veit (1568–1600), Lord of Pappenheim-Schwindegg (1553–1568)
- Geoffrey Henry (1600–1628(32)), Imperial Count 1628

=== Counts of Pappenheim-Treuchtlingen (1628 – 1647) ===
- Geoffrey Henry (1600(28)–1632)
- Wolfgang Adam (1632–1647)
