= Guttenberg Castle (Palatinate) =

Castle in Germany

- Burg Guttenberg
- Oberotterbach
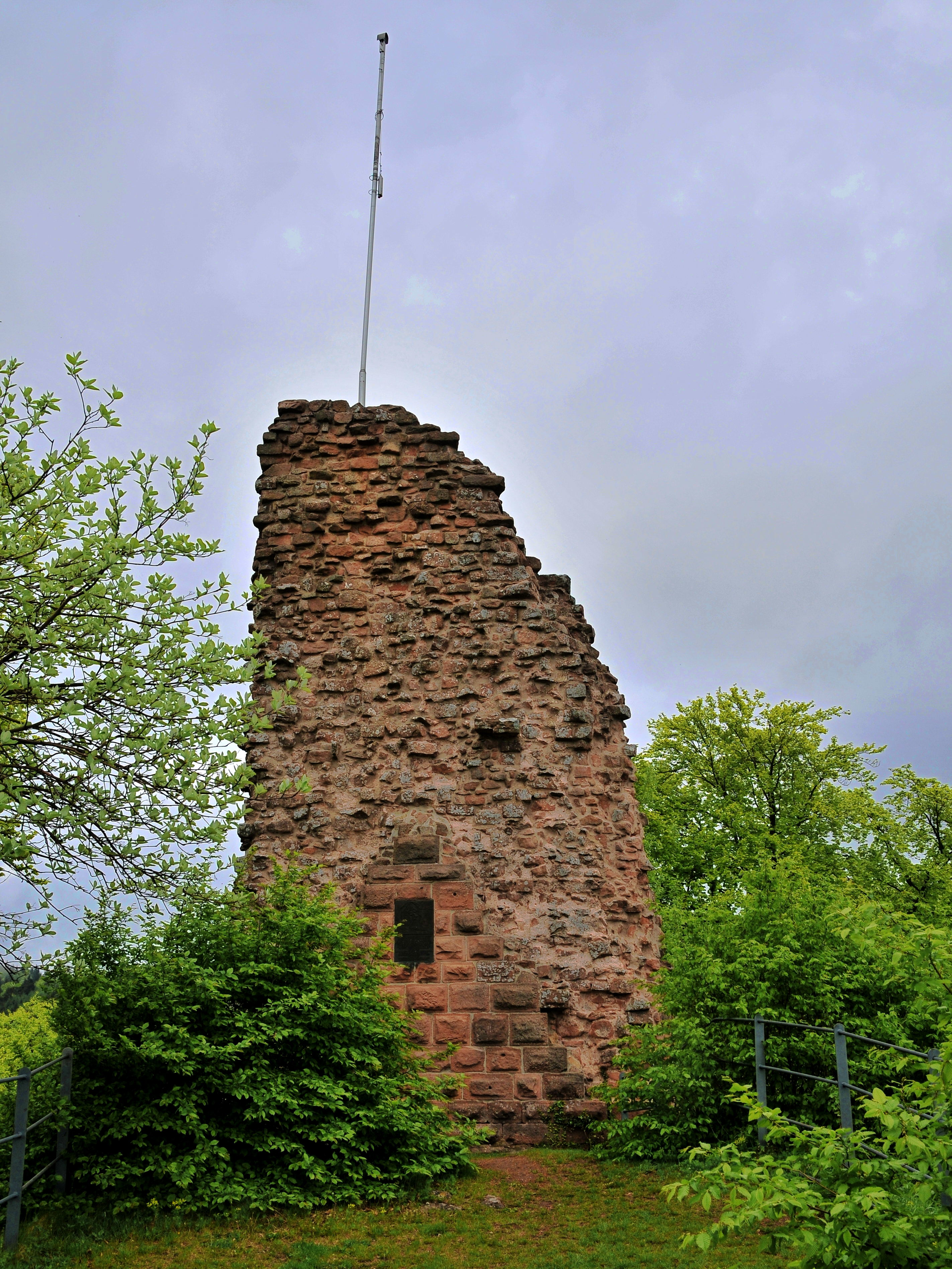
- The bergfried

Site information
- Type: hill castle, rock castle
- Code: DE-RP
- Condition: ruins; remains of the bergfried and curtain walls

Location
- Coordinates: 49°04′39″N 7°55′16″E
- Height: 503 m above sea level (NN)

Site history
- Built: ca. 1150

Garrison information
- Occupants: ministeriales, counts

Guttenberg Castle (German: Burg Guttenberg, more rarely, Guttenburg) is a ruined rock castle near the French border in the German part of the Wasgau, which in turn is part of the Palatine Forest in the state of Rhineland-Palatinate.

== Geography ==
The hill castle is located in the Upper Mundat Forest about three kilometres west of the village of Oberotterbach on the 503-metre-high Schlossberg hill. One kilometre away are the Hohe Derst (561 m) to the northwest and Hohe Kopf (497 m) to the south. The Otterbach, a left tributary of the River Rhine, rises on the northeastern slopes of the Schlossberg, below the castle.

== History ==
The castle was possibly first mentioned in 1151 as an imperial castle of the Hohenstaufen emperors which was managed by the ministerialis, Landolfo de Gudenburc, or it may have been connected with Ulrich of Guttenberg (Udelricus de Gudenburhc) who gifted it in 1174 to Eusserthal Abbey. The first confirmed record occurs in 1246 when Isengard of Falkenstein, on behalf of her husband, the imperial steward (Reichstruchsess), Philip I of Falkenstein, transferred the castle to King Conrad IV.

In 1317, half of the castle was enfeoffed to the counts of Leiningen, whilst the other half went, a little later, to Electoral Palatinate.

In the division of the Palatinate of 1410 the castle was allocated to Stephen, Count Palatine of Simmern-Zweibrücken. The Leiningens lost their share in 1463 when it went via the Hanau-Lichtenbergs to the House of Palatinate-Zweibrücken branch of the Wittelsbach dynasty.

In 1525, during the German Peasants' War Guttenberg Castle was destroyed by a Lorraine peasant mob. The ruins were never rebuilt and its associated office or Amt moved to Dörrenbach. With the extinction of the Heidelberg line in 1559, Palatine Zweibrücken also inherited the other half of the Barony of Guttenberg including the related part of the ruined castle.

From 1680 to 1697 the region was under French hegemony as part of the successes achieved under France's policy of reunion. From 1792 to 1815 the region was part of the French First Republic and was assigned to the département du Bas-Rhin (Department of Lower Rhine). In November 1815 the area between the rivers Lauter and Queich, including the ruins of Guttenberg, came under the sovereignty of the Empire of Austria as a result of the agreements reached in the Second Treaty of Paris. Finally in April 1816 the region of the Palatinate was surrendered in the Treaty of Munich to the Kingdom of Bavaria, becoming the Circle of the Rhine.

After the end of the Second World War the site became the property of the state of Rhineland-Palatinate, but was under French administration from 1949 to 1986.

From 1989 to 1995 safety measures were implemented with the support of the Advisory Board for the Preservation of the Mundat Forest (Kuratoriums zu Erhaltung des Mundatwaldes).

== Literature ==
- Magnus Backes (2003), Staatliche Burgen, Schlösser und Altertümer in Rheinland-Pfalz (in German), Regensburg: Verlag Schnell und Steiner, ISBN 3-7954-1566-7
- Rolf Übel (2002), "Guttenberg" (Auszug), in Jürgen Keddigkeit; Alexander Thon; Rolf Übel (eds.), Pfälzisches Burgenlexikon. Vol. 2. F–H (in German), vol. 12, Kaiserslautern, pp. 251–260, ISBN 3-927754-48-X
- Alexander Thon, ed. (2005), … wie eine gebannte, unnahbare Zauberburg. Burgen in der Südpfalz (in German) (2nd ed.), Regensburg: Verlag Schnell und Steiner, pp. 64–67, ISBN 3795415705
- Rolf Übel (2001), Die Guttenburg bei Oberotterbach. Die Kirchenburg in Dörrenbach (in German), Landau: Verlag für Burgenkunde und Pfalzforschung, ISBN 3-929893-11-8
