= Pappenheim-Gräfenthal =

Holy Roman statelet

Coordinates: 50°32′N 11°18′E

Pappenheim-Gräfenthal Pappenheim-Gräfenthal
- 1444–1599
- Coat of arms
- Status: State of the Holy Roman Empire
- Capital: Gräfenthal
- Common languages: German
- Religion: Roman Catholic; Lutheran 1530
- Government: Feudal monarchy
- Lord
- Historical era: Middle Ages
  - Partitioned from Pappenheim: 1444
  - Extinct: 1599
Preceded by	Succeeded by
Pappenheim	Pappenheim-Grönenbach; Pappenheim-Stühlingen
- Today part of: Germany

Pappenheim-Gräfenthal was a statelet in the Holy Roman Empire that existed from 1444 until 1599.

== History ==
Gräfenthal was first mentioned in 1288. It came to the counts of Weimar-Orlamünde, and later formed the nexus of a minor state. Debts accrued by the Gräfenthal line forced them to approach the wealthy House of Wettin for sale in 1394, finally selling all rights to the territory to the Electorate of Saxony in 1426. In 1438 the Electors sold the territory to the Pappenheims, though they retained the sovereign rights over the territory.

In 1444 the heirs of Haupt II, Marshall of Pappenheim partitioned the family's holdings between themselves. Gräfenthal passed to Conrad III, Haupt's second son, along with half of Schweinspoint and Spielberg. The core hereditary lands of the family were ruled jointly by all branches, and the office of the Imperial Marshal of the Holy Roman Empire was held by the family's most senior agnate. In 1465 he inherited the Imperial Lordship of Breitenegg through his wife, but he sold that territory to Wildenstein in 1473.

Conrad III was succeeded by his grandson Sebastian in 1482, enfeoffed with Gräfenthal by the Elector in 1483. Sebastian fostered a close relationship with the Saxons, accompanying them to the Imperial Diet in 1487. In 1530 he adopted the teachings of Martin Luther.

In 1547 Gräfenthal hosted the Emperor Charles V and the Duke of Alba.

The family died out with Christopher Ulrich in 1599. Gräfenthal was divided between the Grönenbach and Stühlingen lines, and it all came to the Stühlingen line with the extinction of the Grönenbachs in 1619. In debt, Gräfenthal was in turn sold to Saxe-Altenburg in 1621.

== Heads of state ==
=== Lords of Pappenheim-Gräfenthal (1444 – 1599) ===
- Conrad III (1444–1482)
- Sebastian (1482–1536)
- Veit (1536–1556)
- Veit Conrad (1556–1564)
- George Wolfgang (1564–1569)
- Joachim (1569–1575)
- Christopher Ulrich (1575–1599)
