= Pappenheim-Schwindegg =

Holy Roman statelet

Coordinates: 48°16′N 12°15′E

Pappenheim-Schwindegg Pappenheim-Schwindegg
- 1518–1568
- Coat of arms
- Status: State of the Holy Roman Empire
- Capital: Schwindegg
- Common languages: German
- Religion: Roman Catholic; Lutheran 1555
- Government: Feudal monarchy
- Lord
- Historical era: Middle Ages
  - Established: 1518
  - Inherited and renamed to Pappenheim-Treuchtlingen: 1568
Preceded by	Succeeded by
Pappenheim-Treuchtlingen	Pappenheim-Treuchtlingen
- Today part of: Germany

Pappenheim-Schwindegg was a statelet in the Holy Roman Empire that existed from 1518 until 1568.

== History ==
Schwindegg was first mentioned in 1389, and formed an immediate lordship in the Holy Roman Empire, from 1394 ruled by the barons of Fraunhofen.

In 1518 the Fraunhofens became extinct in the male line and Schwindegg passed by marriage of the heiress Anna to Ulrich, a younger son of the lord of Pappenheim-Treuchtlingen, thereby founding the line of Pappenheim-Schwindegg. In 1555 the family converted to Lutheranism. After the Treuchtlingen line became extinct in 1568, the Schwindegg line inherited that territory, and assumed that name and title.

Schwindegg was sold to the knight Sebastian of Haunsperg in 1591.

== Heads of state ==
=== Lords of Pappenheim-Schwindegg (1518 – 1568) ===
- Ulrich (1518–1539)
- George IV (1539–1553)
- Veit (1553–1568), Lord of Pappenheim-Treuchtlingen (1568–1600)
