= Pappenheim-Allgäu =

Small European state in 15th century

Coordinates: 49°03′N 10°52′E

Pappenheim-Allgäu Pappenheim-Allgäu
- 1444–1494
- Coat of arms
- Status: State of the Holy Roman Empire
- Capital: Burg Pappenheim
- Common languages: German
- Religion: Roman Catholic
- Government: Feudal monarchy
- Lord
- Historical era: Middle Ages
  - Partitioned from Pappenheim: 1444
  - Partitioned: 1494
Preceded by	Succeeded by
Pappenheim	Pappenheim-Grönenbach; Pappenheim-Rothenstein
- Today part of: Germany

Pappenheim-Allgäu was a statelet in the Holy Roman Empire that existed from 1444 until it was partitioned in 1494.

== History ==
In 1444 the heirs of Haupt II, Marshall of Pappenheim, partitioned the family's holdings between themselves. A quarter of the family's mediate fiefs passed to Henry XI, Haupt's eldest son. The core hereditary lands of the family were ruled jointly by all branches, and the office of the Imperial Marshal of the Holy Roman Empire was held by the family's most senior agnate, which was Henry.

In 1482, this line inherited Bad Grönenbach and Rothenstein, fiefs of Kempten Abbey, from the House of Rothenstein though this inheritance was disputed by other lines of the Rothenstein family and would only be settled in the Pappenheim's favour in 1508. From these territories comes the name of this line as both of these territories were located in the Allgäu.

In 1494 Henry died and Pappenheim-Allgäu was partitioned by his heirs, forming the lines of Pappenheim-Grönenbach and Pappenheim-Rothenstein.

== Heads of state ==
=== Lords of Pappenheim-Allgäu (1444 – 1494) ===
- Henry XI (1444 – 1494)
