= Hohe Derst =

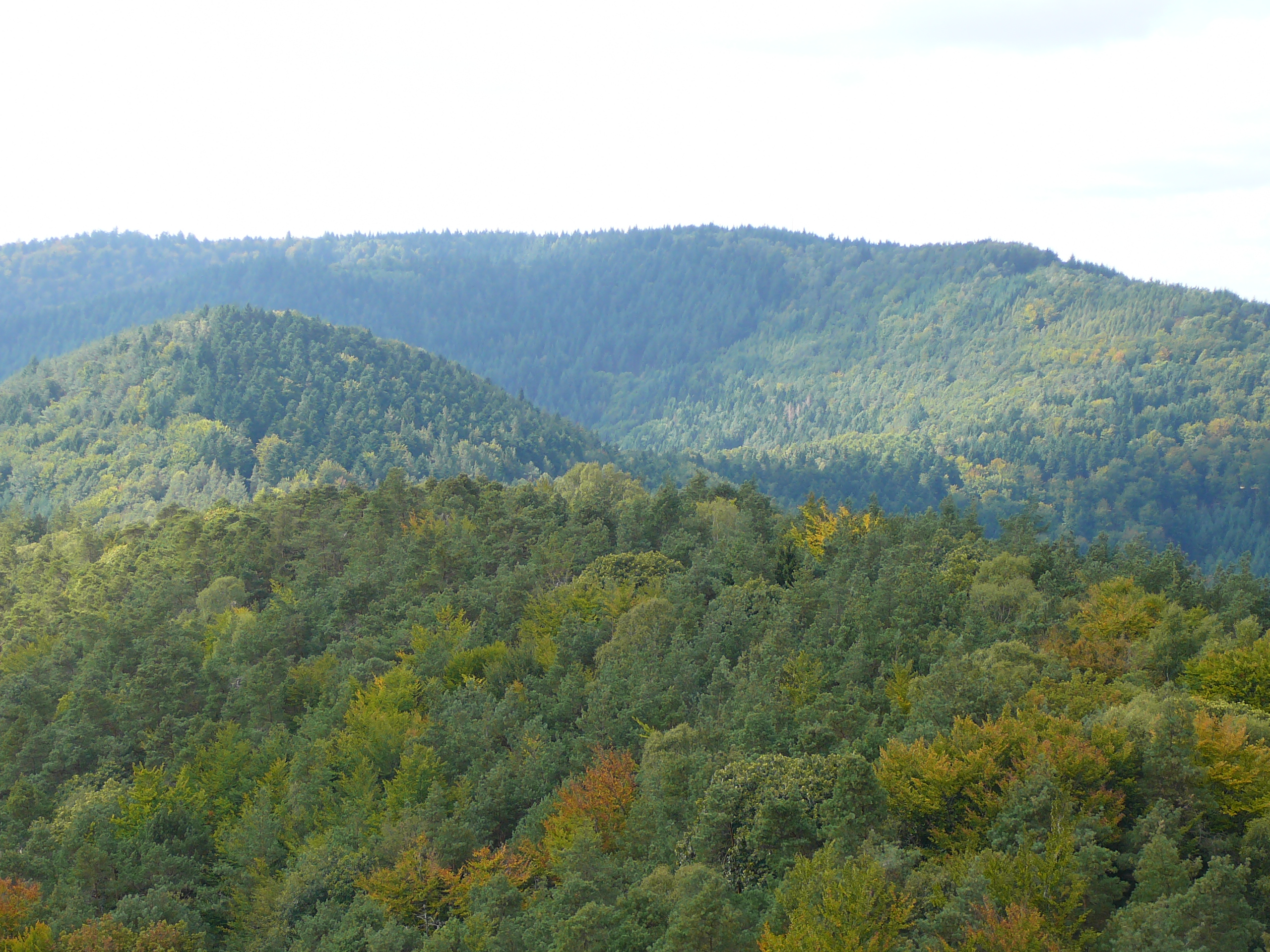
- View of the Hohe Derst (centre rear) looking west from the Stäffelsberg

Highest point
- Elevation: 560 m above sea level (NN) (1,841 ft)
- Coordinates: 49°05′10″N 7°54′50″E

Geography
- Location within Rhineland-Palatinate
- Parent range: Wasgau

The Hohe Derst is a hill, 560 metres above sea level, in the Palatine Forest of southwest Germany. It lies within the Wasgau region and is the highest point of the Mundat Forest.

== Location ==
The Hohe Derst is situated on the territory of the parishes of Böllenborn and Oberotterbach above the hamlet of Reisdorf, five kilometres east of the town of Bad Bergzabern. The Landesstraße 492 state road runs around the hill to a walkers' car park.

== Structures ==
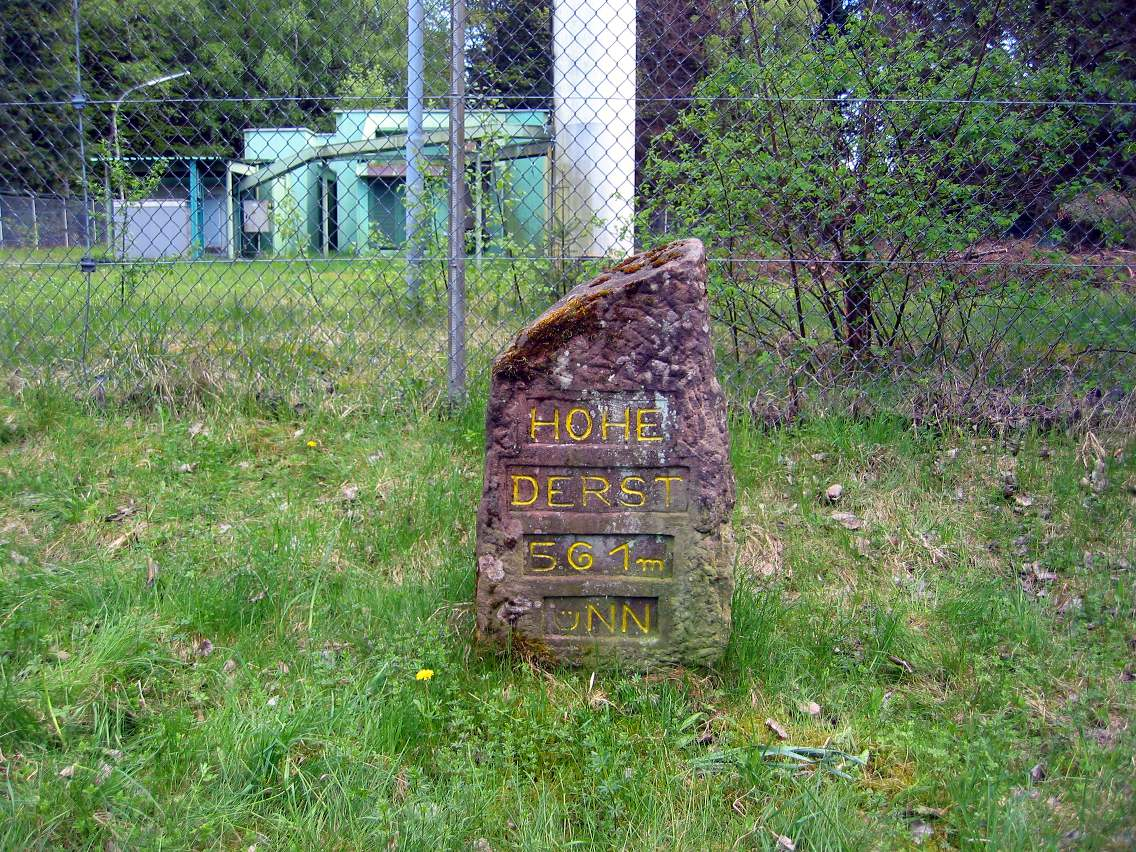
The Ritterstein marking the summit

A military radio-relay tower stands on the Hohe Derst near the Ritterstein marking the summit. It was originally used by the US Army (Central Army Group - CENTAG) and Air Force NATO, as part of the "Tiger" group of high-frequency radio line-of-sight sites. This was known as "Tiger 40, but they gave it up after the end of the Cold War. It continues to be used by the Bundeswehr.

A short way below the summit is a transmission site for the German broadcasters, Südwestrundfunk, which broadcasts analogue TV to much of the South Palatinate and the Wasgau and which will be switched off with the advent of DVB-T. There were plans to provide transmitters here to broadcast the Rhineland-Palatine programmes, SWR1 Rheinland-Pfalz and SWR4 Rheinland-Pfalz to this region, because they are not able to be received here, but these plans came to nothing.
