= Oberotterbach =

- Municipality
- Coat of arms

- Location of Oberotterbach within Südliche Weinstraße district
- Interactive map of Oberotterbach
- Location within Germany Location within Rhineland-Palatinate
- Coordinates: 49°04′16″N 7°58′14″E
- Country: Germany
- State: Rhineland-Palatinate
- District: Südliche Weinstraße
- Municipal assoc.: Bad Bergzabern

Government
  - Mayor (2019–24): Heinz Oerther

Area
  - Total: 15.37 km^{2} (5.93 sq mi)
- Elevation: 192 m (630 ft)

Population (2025-12-31)
  - Total: 1,123
  - Density: 73.06/km^{2} (189.2/sq mi)
- Time zone: UTC+01:00 (CET)
  - Summer (DST): UTC+02:00 (CEST)
- Postal codes: 76889
- Dialling codes: 06342
- Vehicle registration: SÜW
- Website: www.oberotterbach.de

Oberotterbach is a municipality in Südliche Weinstraße district, in Rhineland-Palatinate, western Germany.

== Geography ==
The village is located between the Palatine Forest biosphere reserve and the Rhine river.

The municipality of Oberotterbach also includes the settlements of Brendelsmühle and Heidenbrunnenhof.

== History ==
The village was first mentioned in 992 in a deed of grant from emperor Otto III to Selz Abbey located in the Alsace region.

== Religion ==
In 2007, 55.6 percent of the population were Protestant and 25.4 percent were Roman Catholic. The rest were not registered to pay Church tax.

== Politics ==
=== Gemeinderat ===
The local council Gemeinderat in Oberotterbach consists of 16 members, who were elected on 7 June 2009 and work for the voluntary mayor as their chairman.

=== Coat of arms ===
The blazon of the coat of arms are: „Parteed and separated above, documented with the silver heart shield, within a red armoured and defeated blue lion, on top heraldic in black a red armoured and defeated gold lion. On top on the left it is silver and blue lozenged, located at the bottom in green is a silver silberner an angular wave bar aside from silver spheres“.

It was approved by the Bavarian imperial governor in 1938 and dates back to a seal from 1558.

== Culture and Sights ==
- Ruin of Guttenberg Castle located in the Mundat Forest; Staeffelsberg Tower (observation tower, 1887)
- Westwall-Hiking Trail – comprising a ten-kilometre-long hiking trail along blasted bunkers and war trenches established in June 2009.
