= Mundat Forest =

Coordinates: 49.04°N 7.91°E

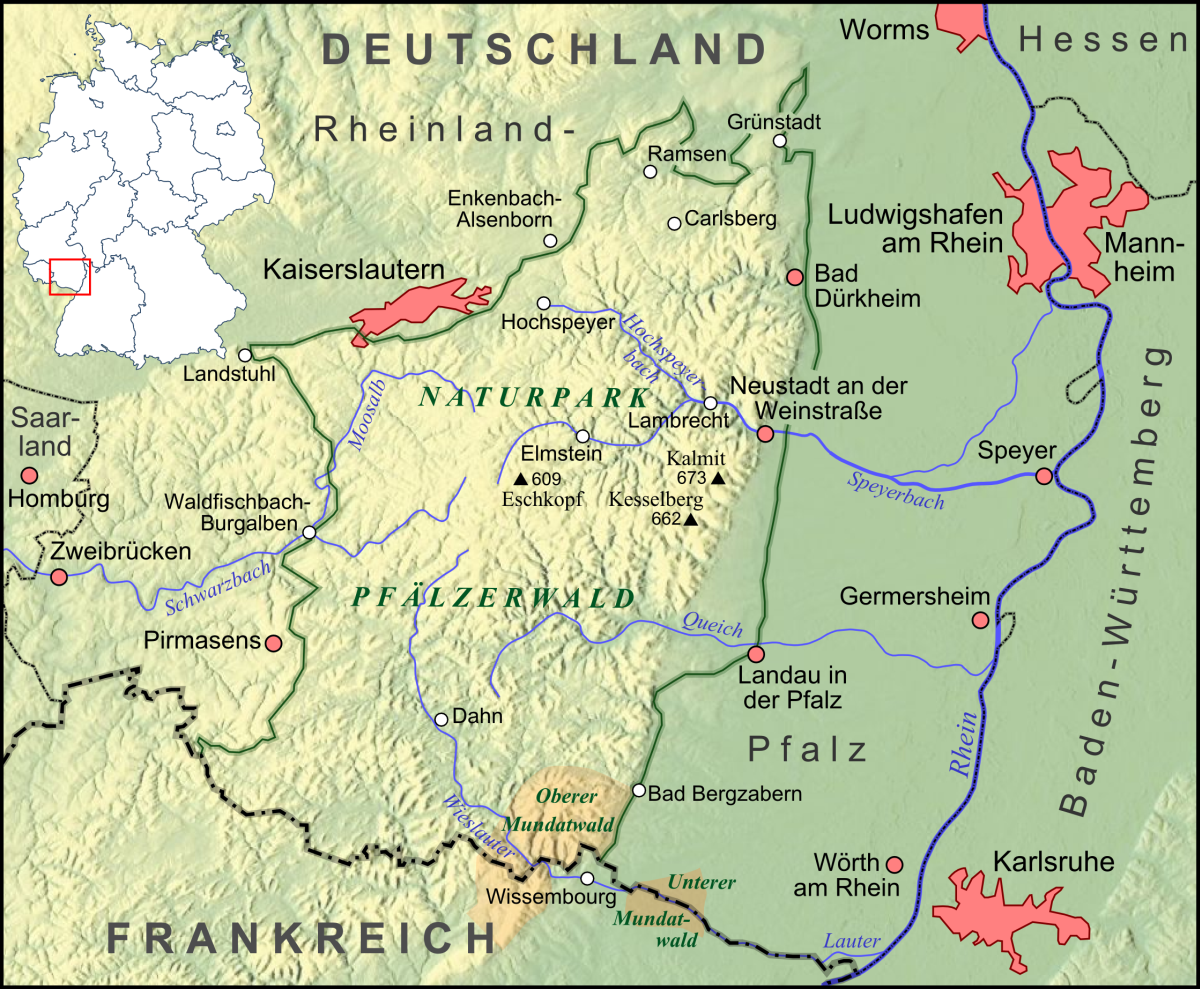
Palatinate Forest (Pfälzerwald) with Upper (left) and Lower (right) Mundat Forests (ochre tint) at the southern border

The term 'Mundat Forest' refers to two forests that overlie the modern border between Germany and France near Wissembourg, Alsace. The Upper Mundat Forest is a small part of the mountainous Palatinate Forest. The smaller Lower Mundat Forest forms a fraction of the Bienwald in the Upper Rhine valley.

In the Middle Ages the forests were part of the Wissembourg Mundat, the privileged possessions of the abbey of Weissenburg (now Wissembourg), whose abbot was a territorial magnate, a Prince-abbot of the Holy Roman Empire. The unusual term, Mundat, refers to the immunity (emunitas) granted by the royal conveyor of property, which rendered the abbey immune from obligations of service for the grant of vast privileged domains situated within the diocese of Speyer.

== Geography ==
The Upper Mundat Forest is an area of roughly 40 square kilometres (15 sq mi) that stretches north and west from the Alsatian town Wissembourg. Its highest point, at 561 metres (1,841 ft), is the Hohe Derst near the hamlet of Reisdorf. The area includes the remains of Guttenberg Castle, c. 1150. It is part of the cross-border UNESCO biosphere reserve Pfälzerwald–Vosges du Nord.

The Lower Mundat Forest is an area of roughly 20 square kilometres (8 sq mi), east of Wissembourg in the plain formed by the Rhine rift. Geographically it is part of the Bienwald. Its highest elevation is 141 metres (463 ft).

The Upper and Lower Mundat Forests together make up the still-forested part of the Mundat, the former possessions of the 7th–16th century monastery and principality at Wissembourg. To distinguish it from the similar but unrelated Mundat at Rouffach further south, it is also known as the Wissembourg Mundat or, confusingly, the Lower Mundat – the Rouffach Mundat being the Upper Mundat.

== History of the Wissembourg Mundat ==
Wissembourg was initially a monastery (Weissenburg Abbey), founded around 630–660 and part of the Benedictine order from the 8th century. In 760, Charlemagne's father Pepin the Short granted immunity from services to the monastery and its possessions in field and forest. These possessions, the Mundat, had dimensions of about 20 km × 16 km (12.4 mi × 9.9 mi) and included the villages of Altenstadt, Schleithal, Oberseebach, Steinseltz, Oberhoffen, Cleebourg, Rott, Weiler, St. Germanshof, Bobenthal, Schlettenbach, Finsternheim, Bärenbach, Schweigen and Rechtenbach, Schweighofen, Kapsweyer, and Steinfeld. The Mundat Forest was known in Carolingian times as the Sylva immunita. In 974 the monastery, along with the Mundat, obtained the independent status of an Imperial abbey headed by a prince-abbot.

In 1524 the monastery was heavily encumbered, so Pope Clement VII transformed it into a collegiate church, and from 1546 it stood under the authority of Speyer.

== After secularization ==
The forested areas remained the property of the church until they were secularized after the French Revolution.

After Napoleon, the border between France and the Palatinate (then under Bavarian rule) was fixed by the Treaty of Paris in 1815. With the exception of Wissembourg, all the French territories north of the river Lauter fell to the Kingdom of Bavaria. Since then the border has remained unchanged in this area, except for Alsace twice being German, between 1871 and 1919 and again de facto between 1941 and 1944.

There was, however, an anomaly concerning land ownership. As a result of the treaty the town of Wissembourg had 30 square kilometres (12 sq mi) of forest on the German side of the border, in co-ownership with the Bavarian state. It also owned 20 square kilometres (8 mi^{2}) on the French side, jointly with the French state. This situation was rectified through land exchanges in the 1930s, in part through a treaty signed in 1959 that became effective retroactively as of 1938.

== Anomaly after World War II ==
In 1946, the administration of the French zone of occupied Germany made an area of 7 square kilometres (2.7 sq mi) in the German part of the Upper Mundat Forest administratively a part of France, in order to guarantee the water catchment area for Wissembourg. This was formalized as part of Order No. 212, issued by the French Commander-in-Chief in Germany Koenig in April 1949. The area was put under exclusive French administration, preserving only German territorial sovereignty over the area. Initially the area included the hamlet St. Germanshof, but a correction in 1949 ensured that only uninhabited land was affected. A formal annexation, transferring also the territorial sovereignty to France, seems to have been planned originally, but it was never executed.

Negotiations about the status of the area led to its inclusion in a 1962 treaty that revisited several border issues between the two countries. The treaty would have made the entire area French territory, but as it was not ratified by the German parliament it did not become operative.

In 1984 the final agreement was reached, essentially trading administrative sovereignty against private ownership of the same area. In an exchange of diplomatic notes, the French government agreed to repeal the relevant clause of Order 212. In return, the West German government committed itself to transfer to France the land ownership over the public land in the area. France also obtained perpetual wood, hunting and water rights for the area as well as compensatory land for the castle, which it did not get. Once France, the United States and the United Kingdom had agreed, the Bundestag was able to repeal the clause, which it did effective in February 1986. The transfer of land ownership to France according to the German regulations was completed in 1990.

While the attempts to normalize the situation were ongoing, there was vocal protest by a number of West German citizens who rejected any solution that acknowledged the French claim. In the 1960s one objector pressed criminal charges, a retired appellate court president drew public comparisons to the Soviet occupation zone, and a law journal published criticism. In 1988 a retired notary requested that a local court appoint him to represent the interests of the German Reich against the Federal Republic of Germany. He argued that since the area in question was under French administration when the West German state was founded in 1949, the Weimar constitution was still in force in it. The court did appoint the ex-notary, but this decision was reversed half a year later by the next higher court, which found that there is no reason to doubt that the area is part of the German state of Rhineland-Palatinate.

In 2007 and 2008, German courts decided that French citizens leasing hunting rights in the northern part of the Upper Mundat Forest from the French state must follow German regulations when feeding deer.
