= Pomerania-Demmin =

Former monarchy in Europe

Duchy of Pomerania-Demmin (Teil-)Herzogtum Pommern-Demmin (German) Księstwo dymińskie (Polish) Ducatus Dyminiensis (Latin)
- 1160–1264
- Coat of arms
- Status: State of the Holy Roman Empire
- Capital: Demmin
- Religion: Roman Catholic
- Government: Feudal duchy
- Duke
  - 1160–1180 (first): Casimir I
  - 1219/1920–1264 (last): Wartislaw III
- Historical era: High Middle Ages; Late Middle Ages
  - Partition of the Duchy of Pomerania: 1160
  - Unification of the Duchy of Pomerania: 1264
Preceded by	Succeeded by
Duchy of Pomerania	Duchy of Pomerania
- Today part of: Poland; Germany

The Duchy of Pomerania-Demmin, (Note: German: (Teil-)Herzogtum Pommern-Demmin) also known as the Duchy of Demmin, and the Duchy of Dymin, (Note: Polish: Księstwo dymińskie; Latin: Ducatus Dyminiensis) was a feudal duchy in Western Pomerania within the Holy Roman Empire. Its capital was Demmin. It was ruled by the Griffin dynasty. It existed in the High Middle Ages era, between 1160 and 1264.

The state was formed in 1160, in the partition of the Duchy of Pomerania, with duke Casimir I, as its first ruler. After death of its last ruler, duke Wartislaw III, the state was united with Pomerania-Stettin, forming the Duchy of Pomerania.

== List of rulers ==
- Casimir I (1160–1180)
- Bogislaw II and Casimir II (1187–1202)
- Casimir II (1202–1219/1220)
- Wartislaw III (1219/1220–1264)

== Citations ==
=== Bibliography ===
- K. Kozłowski, J. Podralski, Gryfici. Książęta Pomorza Zachodniego, Szczecin, Krajowa Agencja Wydawnicza, 1985, ISBN 83-03-00530-8, OCLC 189424372.
- J. W. Szymański, Książęcy ród Gryfitów, Goleniów–Kielce 2006, ISBN 83-7273-224-8.
- U. Scheil, Barnim I. Herzog von Pommern, NDB, ADB Deutsche Biographie
