= Plesse Castle =

Castle north of Göttingen

Coordinates: 51°35′51″N 9°57′57″E

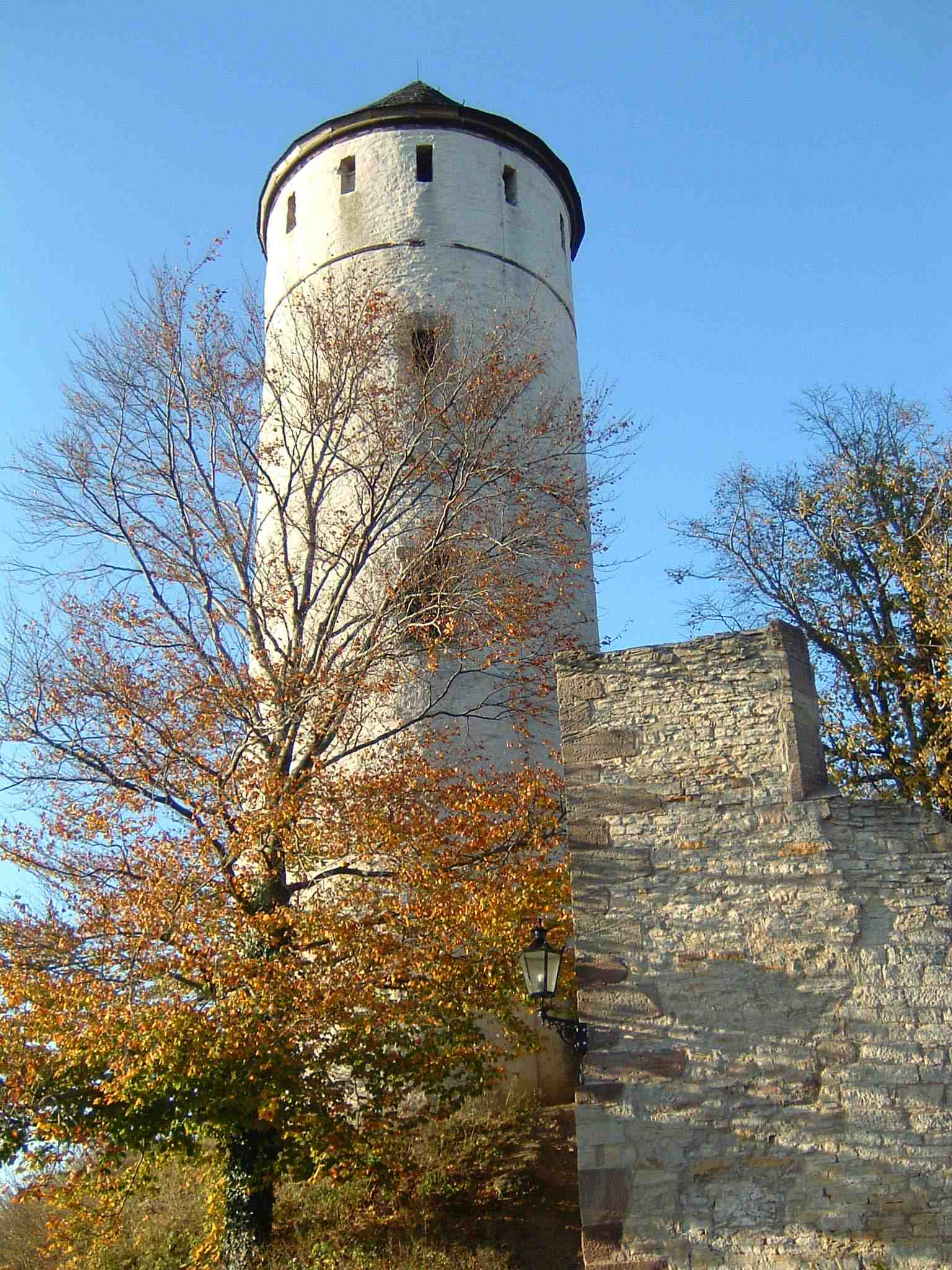
Plesse Castle

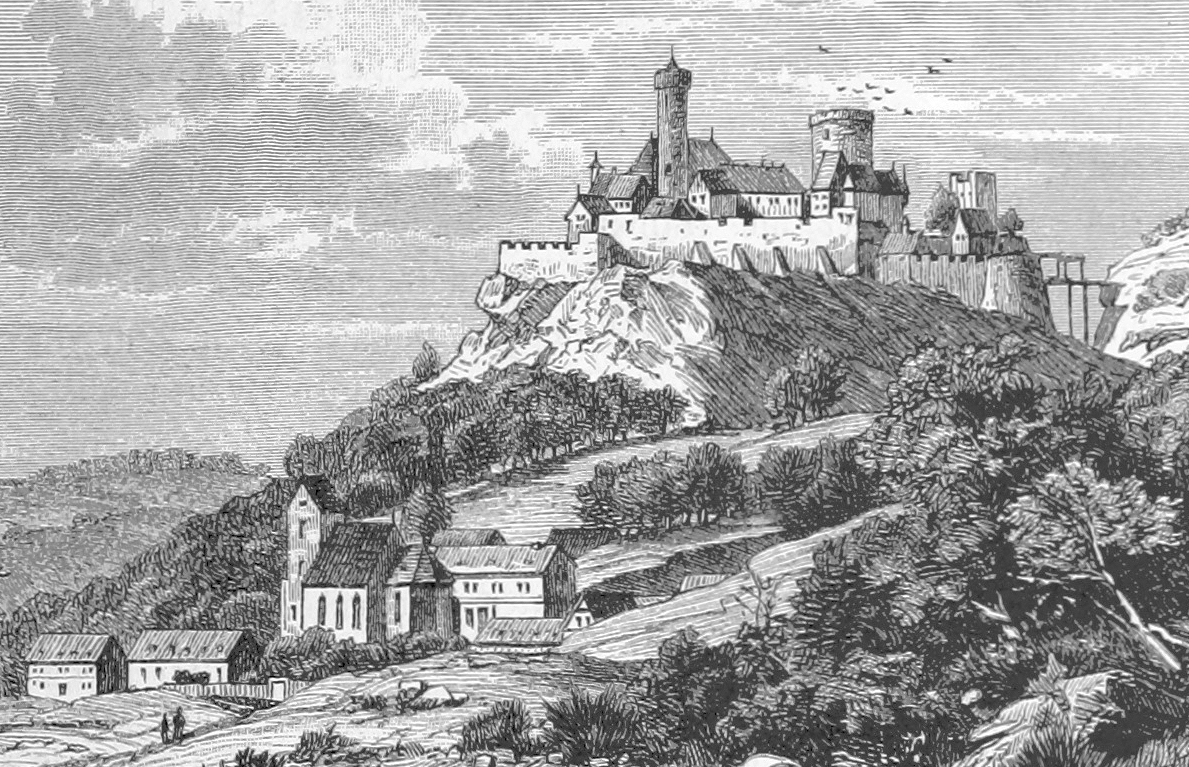
Plesse Castle around 1650

Plesse Castle is situated to the north of Göttingen in Germany, close to the village of Bovenden.

== History ==
The castle was transferred in 1015 from the private estate of Meinwerk, bishop of Paderborn to the city of Paderborn. Since 1150 it is the seat of the noble lords of Plesse, who named themselves for the castle. Holy Roman emperor Henry VI traded Plesse Castle in 1192 for Desenberg Castle close to Warburg in Westphalia, but the trade was already reverted in 1195. In 1447 the lords of Plesse transferred their possession of Plesse Castle to the Landgrave Ludwig of Hesse and in return received it as a fiefdom. The explanation for it lies in the fragmentation of the dukedom of Brunswick-Göttingen. The leading noble families could not avoid being drawn into the ensuing conflicts. They therefore sought protection from a powerful liege lord. They found this protection and backup with another ruler, who was Ludwig of Hesse.

In 1536 the Protestant Reformation was introduced to the dominion of Plesse, which also comprised the surrounding villages. The house of Plesse became extinct with the death of Dietrich IV of Plesse in 1571. Landgrave William IV of Hesse-Kassel (or Hesse-Cassel) then took possession of the dominion of Plesse, as this was his right as liege lord. Moritz of Hesse-Kassel converted the people of the Plesse dominion to the reformed creed in 1614. Between 1623 and 1624 he and his family took refuge in the castle various times. After a siege in 1627 during the Thirty Years' War the castle and the dominion of Plesse were ceded temporarily to the landgrave George II of Hesse-Darmstadt. In 1660 the castle was abandoned finally and afterwards served as a quarry for the residents of the surrounding villages.

Johann Wolfgang von Goethe visited the castle in 1801. Prior to French occupation in 1807, the dominion became the Canton Bovenden in the Kingdom of Westphalia. After the collapse of Westphalia in 1813 the now Electorate of Hesse-Kassel retook control of the dominion of Plesse. In a barter between Prussia, the Kingdom of Hanover and the Electorate of Hesse-Kassel the dominion of Plesse became part of Hanover on May 1, 1817. Starting in 1821 first attempts to restore parts of the castle were undertaken, and between 1853 and 1864, on initiative of the ruling family of Hanover, it came to a complete restoration of the castle. The earlier affiliation of Plesse to Hesse can still be seen even today. The villages of the former dominion of Plesse still belong not to the Evangelical Lutheran State Church of Hanover, but belong to the Evangelical Reformed Church.
