= Pomerania-Rügenwalde =

Former state in Europe

Duchy of Pomerania-Rügenwalde (Teil-)Herzogtum Pommern-Rügenwalde (German) Księstwo darłowskie (Polish) Ducatus Dirlowensis (Latin)
- 1569–1625
- Coat of arms
- Status: State of the Holy Roman Empire
- Capital: Darłowo
- Religion: Roman Catholic
- Government: Feudal duchy
- Duke
  - 1569–1603 (first): Barnim X
  - 1606–1625 (last): Bogislaw XIV
- Historical era: Early modern period
  - Partition from Pomerania-Stettin: 1569
  - Unification of the Duchy of Pomerania: 1625
Preceded by	Succeeded by
Pomerania-Stettin	Duchy of Pomerania
- Today part of: Poland

The Duchy of Pomerania-Rügenwalde, (Note: German: (Teil-)Herzogtum Pommern-Rügenwalde) also known as the Duchy of Rügenwalde, and the Duchy of Darłowo, (Note: Polish: Księstwo darłowskie; Latin: Ducatus Dirlowensis, Ducatus Rugenwaldensis) was a feudal duchy in Western Pomerania within the Holy Roman Empire. Its capital was Darłowo. It was ruled by the Griffin dynasty. It existed in the early modern period, from 1569 to 1625.

The state was formed in 1569, from the part of the territory of Pomerania-Stettin, with duke Barnim X, as its first ruler. It existed until 1625, when, under the rule of duke Bogislaw XIV, it was incorporated into the unified Duchy of Pomerania.

== List of rulers ==
- Barnim X (1569–1603)
- Bogislaw XIII (1603–1606)
- George II and Bogislaw XIV (1606–1617)
- Bogislaw XIV (1617–1625)

== Citations ==
=== Bibliography ===
- Rodowód książąt pomorskich by E. Rymar. Szczecin. Pomeranian Library. 2005. ISBN 83-87879-50-9, OCLC 69296056. (Polish)
