= Alesheim =

- Municipality
- Coat of arms

- Location of Alesheim within Weißenburg-Gunzenhausen district
- Interactive map of Alesheim
- Location within Germany Location within Bavaria
- Coordinates: 49°03′N 10°52′E
- Country: Germany
- State: Bavaria
- Admin. region: Mittelfranken
- District: Weißenburg-Gunzenhausen
- Municipal assoc.: Altmühltal

Government
  - Mayor (2020–26): Manfred Schuster (FW)

Area
  - Total: 20.45 km^{2} (7.90 sq mi)
- Elevation: 427 m (1,401 ft)

Population (2025-12-31)
  - Total: 962
  - Density: 47.0/km^{2} (122/sq mi)
- Time zone: UTC+01:00 (CET)
  - Summer (DST): UTC+02:00 (CEST)
- Postal codes: 91793
- Dialling codes: 09146
- Vehicle registration: WUG

Alesheim is a municipality in the Weißenburg-Gunzenhausen district, in Bavaria, Germany.
