= Schwindegg =

- Municipality
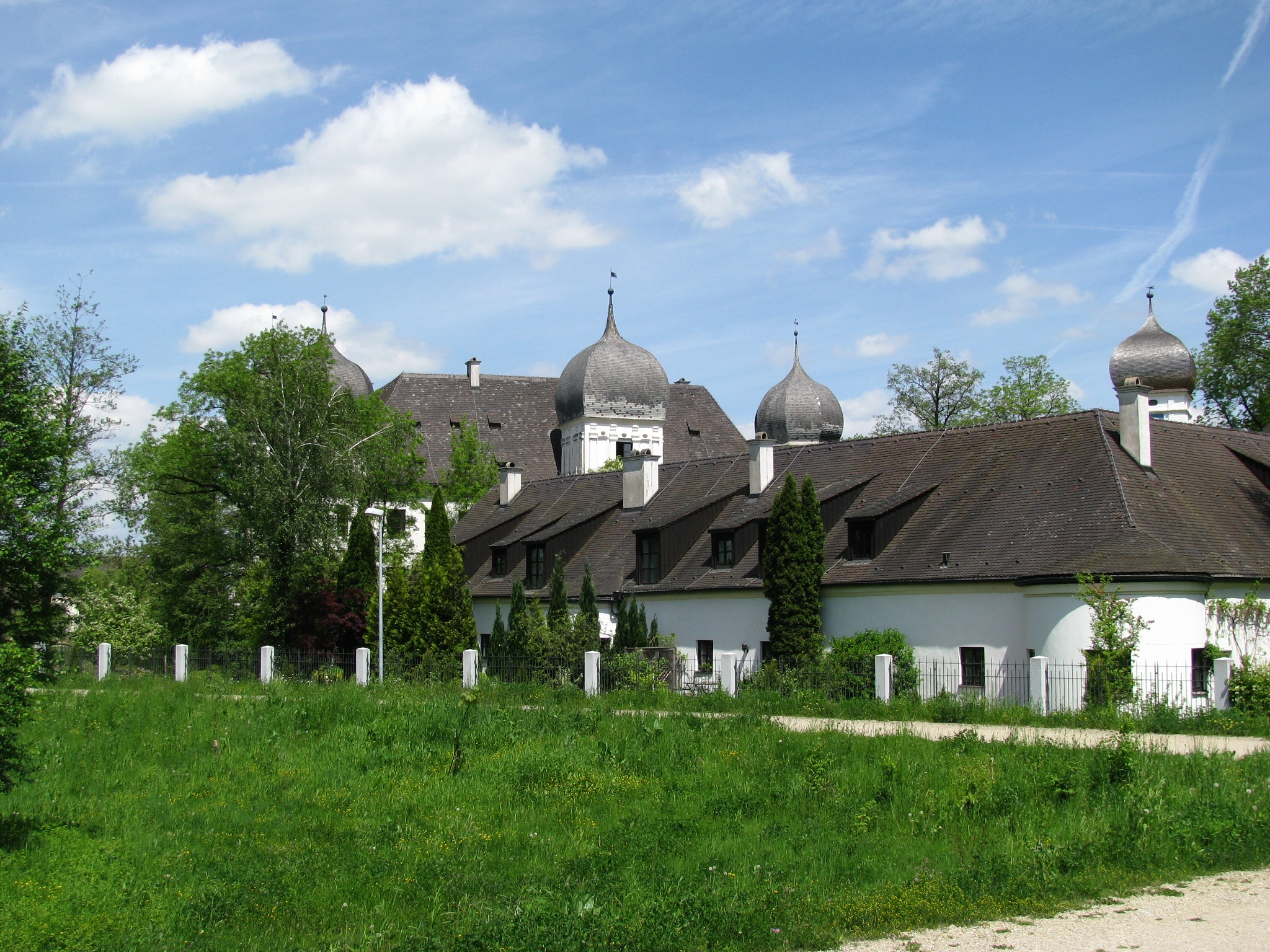
- Schwindegg Castle

- Coat of arms

- Location of Schwindegg within Mühldorf am Inn district
- Interactive map of Schwindegg
- Location within Germany Location within Bavaria
- Coordinates: 48°16′N 12°15′E
- Country: Germany
- State: Bavaria
- Admin. region: Oberbayern
- District: Mühldorf am Inn
- Subdivisions: 6 Ortsteile

Government
  - Mayor (2020–26): Roland Kamhuber (CSU)

Area
  - Total: 20.00 km^{2} (7.72 sq mi)
- Elevation: 431 m (1,414 ft)

Population (2025-12-31)
  - Total: 3,461
  - Density: 173.1/km^{2} (448.2/sq mi)
- Time zone: UTC+01:00 (CET)
  - Summer (DST): UTC+02:00 (CEST)
- Postal codes: 84419
- Dialling codes: 08082
- Vehicle registration: MÜ
- Website: www.schwindegg.de

Schwindegg is a municipality in the district of Mühldorf in Bavaria in Germany.
