= Pappenheim (state) =

County in Bavaria, Germany (1030–1806)

Coordinates: 48°56′5″N 10°58′28″E

Lordship (County) of Pappenheim Herrschaft (Grafschaft) Pappenheim
- 1030–1806
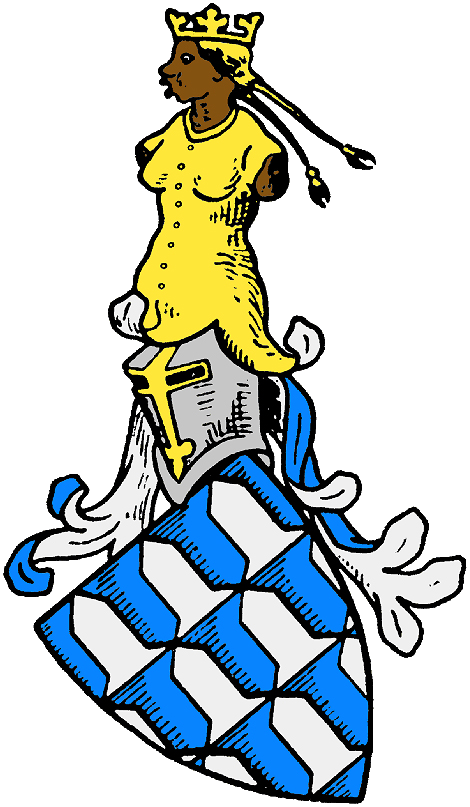
- Coat of arms
- Status: State of the Holy Roman Empire
- Capital: Pappenheim
- Government: Principality
- Historical era: Middle Ages
  - Lordship founded: ca 1030
  - Partitioned in four: 1439
  - Partitioned in twain: 1558
  - Raised to county: 1628
  - Stühlingen inherited by Fürstenberg: 1629
  - Mediatised to Bavaria: 1806
Preceded by	Succeeded by
Duchy of Swabia	Kingdom of Bavaria

Coat of arms of the Lords and Counts of Pappenheim as hereditary marshals of the Holy Roman Empire

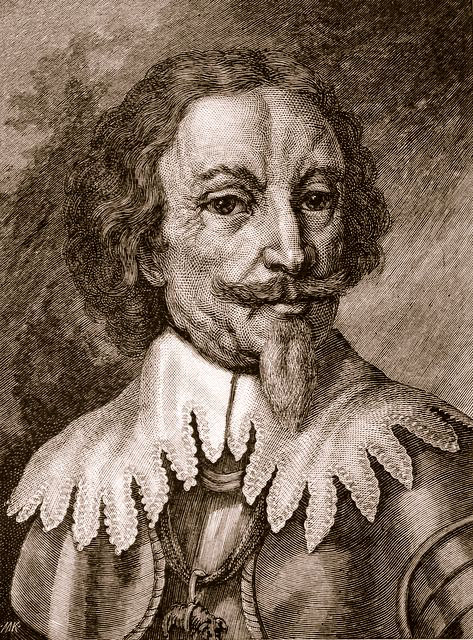
Gottfried Heinrich Graf zu Pappenheim (1594–1632), field marshal of the Holy Roman Empire in the Thirty Years' War

Pappenheim was a German county in western Bavaria, Germany, located on the Altmühl river between Treuchtlingen and Solnhofen, and south of Weißenburg. As former sovereign family, mediatized to Bavaria in 1806, the family which ruled the state belongs to High nobility.

== History ==
Pappenheim originated as a Lordship around 1030, and was raised to a county in 1628.

The first member of the House of Pappenheim was Henricus Caput, mentioned in 1111 as vassal of Henry V, Holy Roman Emperor. From about 1100 until 1806 the Lords and Counts of Pappenheim held the position of hereditary marshals of the Holy Roman Empire, a court office that made them deputies of the Empire's arch marshals, the Electors of Saxony, with certain ceremonial tasks at the Coronation of the Holy Roman Emperor. Being immediate to the Emperor, Pappenheim was a member of the Swabian bench of Imperial Counts with one collective vote in the Imperial Diet.

Pappenheim was partitioned twice: between itself, Alesheim (Aletzheim), Gräfenthal and Treuchtlingen in 1439; and between itself and Stühlingen in 1558. Pappenheim absorbed Alesheim in 1697, Gräfenthal in 1536, and Treuchtlingen in 1647. Treuchtlingen was purchased in 1447/53 and, after the Treuchtlingen branch went extinct in 1647, became part of the Principality of Ansbach. Stühlingen, acquired in 1582, was inherited by Fürstenberg in 1639. Pappenheim was mediatised by Bavaria in 1806.

In 1815, the Congress of Vienna recognized that Pappenheim should receive compensation for their loss of the hereditary office of Imperial marshal. The former Saar department of the First French Empire was divided five ways, with one of the portions granted to Pappenheim as sovereign territory. Shortly thereafter, the family exchanged title to their land to Prussia for a monetary payment. Pappenheim was formally recognized by Bavaria as a mediatized house in 1831, after all claims were settled.

The arms of House of Pappenheim are Vair plain. The head of the family has Quarterly 1&4 Arch-Marshal of the Holy Roman Empire (parti per fess Sable and Argent, two swords in saltire Gules), 2&3 Pappenheim (Vair plain).

== Heads of state ==
=== Lords of Pappenheim (c. 1030–1628) ===
- Henry I (c. 1030–?)
- Henry II
- Henry III
- Ernest (?–1170)
- Henry I (1170–93)
- Rudolph I (1193–1221)
- Frederick (1221–40) with...
  - Rudolph II (1221–33)
- Henry III (1240–78)
- Henry IV (1278–1318)
- Rudolph I (1313–35)
- Rudolph II (1335–45)
- Henry V (1345–87)
- Haupt I (1387–1409)
- Haupt II (1409–39) with...
  - Sigismund (1409–36)
- Henry VI (1439–82)
- William (1482–1508)
- Joachim (1508–36)
- Wolfgang I (1536–58)
- Christopher (1558–69) with...
  - Philip (1558–19) and...
  - Wolfgang II (1558–85) and...
- Wolfgang Christopher (1585–1628)

=== Counts of Pappenheim (1628–1806) ===
- Wolfgang Christopher (1628–35)
- Wolfgang Philip (Count of Aletzheim) (1628–71)
- Charles Philip Gustav (1671–92)
- Louis Francis (1692–97)
- Christian Ernest (Count of Aletzheim) (1697–1721) with...
  - John Frederick (Count of Aletzheim) (1697–1731) and...
  - Frederick Ernest (1721–25) and...
  - Albert Louis Frederick (1725–33)
- Frederick Ferdinand (1733–73)
- John Frederick Ferdinand (1773–92)
- Charles Theodore Frederick Eugene Francis (1792–1806)
  - Frederick William (regent) (1792–97)

=== After German Mediatization ===
- Karl Theodor/Charles Theodore (1771–1853), Count 1792-1853 ∞ Countess Lucie von Hardenberg-Reventlow (1776–1854)
- Albert (1777–1860), Count 1853-1860 ∞ Baroness Maria Antoinetta Tänzl von Tratzberg (1793–1861)
  - Ludwig (1815–1883), Count 1860-1883 (Lutheran branch) ∞ Countess Anastasia von Schlieffen (1827–1898)
    - Maximilian (1860–1920), Count 1883-1890/91, renounced his rights 1890/91 ∞ Mary Wistar Wheeler (b. 1872)
    - Ludwig (1862–1905), Count 1890/91-1905 ∞ Countess Julie von Rüdiger (1868–1950)
      - Ludwig (1898–1960), Count 1905–1960, owner of the Pappenheim estate ∞ Baroness Liutta von Ribeaupierre (1900–1959)
        - Countess Ursula (1927–2018), heiress of Pappenheim estate ∞ Count Gert von der Recke von Volmerstein (1921–1991)
          - Countess Iniga von der Recke-Volmerstein (b. 1952) ∞ Count Albrecht von und zu Egloffstein (b. 1946)
            - Countess Isabelle von und zu Egloffstein (b. 1975) ∞ Prince Karl Emich of Leiningen
            - Countess Julie von und zu Egloffstein (b. 1975) ∞ Count Thibaud de Rohan-Chabot
            - Countess Désirée von und zu Egloffstein (b. 1977)
            - Count Johannes Georg Albrecht von und zu Egloffstein (b. 1994)
  - Count Alexander (1819-1890), owner of Iszkaszentgyörgy Palace in Hungary (Roman catholic branch) ∞ Baroness Valerie Bajzáth de Pészak (1827–1922)
    - Count Siegfried (1868-1936) ∞ Countess Elisabeth Károlyi de Nagy-Károly (1872–1954)
      - Alexander (1905–1995), Count 1960-1995 ∞ (div. 1957) Maria Zeyk de Zeykfalva (1912–1974), ∞ Princess Eduarda von und zu Liechtenstein (1913–2001)
        - Albert (born 1943), Count 1995–present
      - Count Georg (1909-1986) ∞ Mechtild-Karin von Veltheim (1913–2008)
        - Hereditary Count Alexander (b.1948) ∞ Countess Marie-Christine von Hartig (b. 1950)
          - Count Georg (b.1981)

== Gallery ==
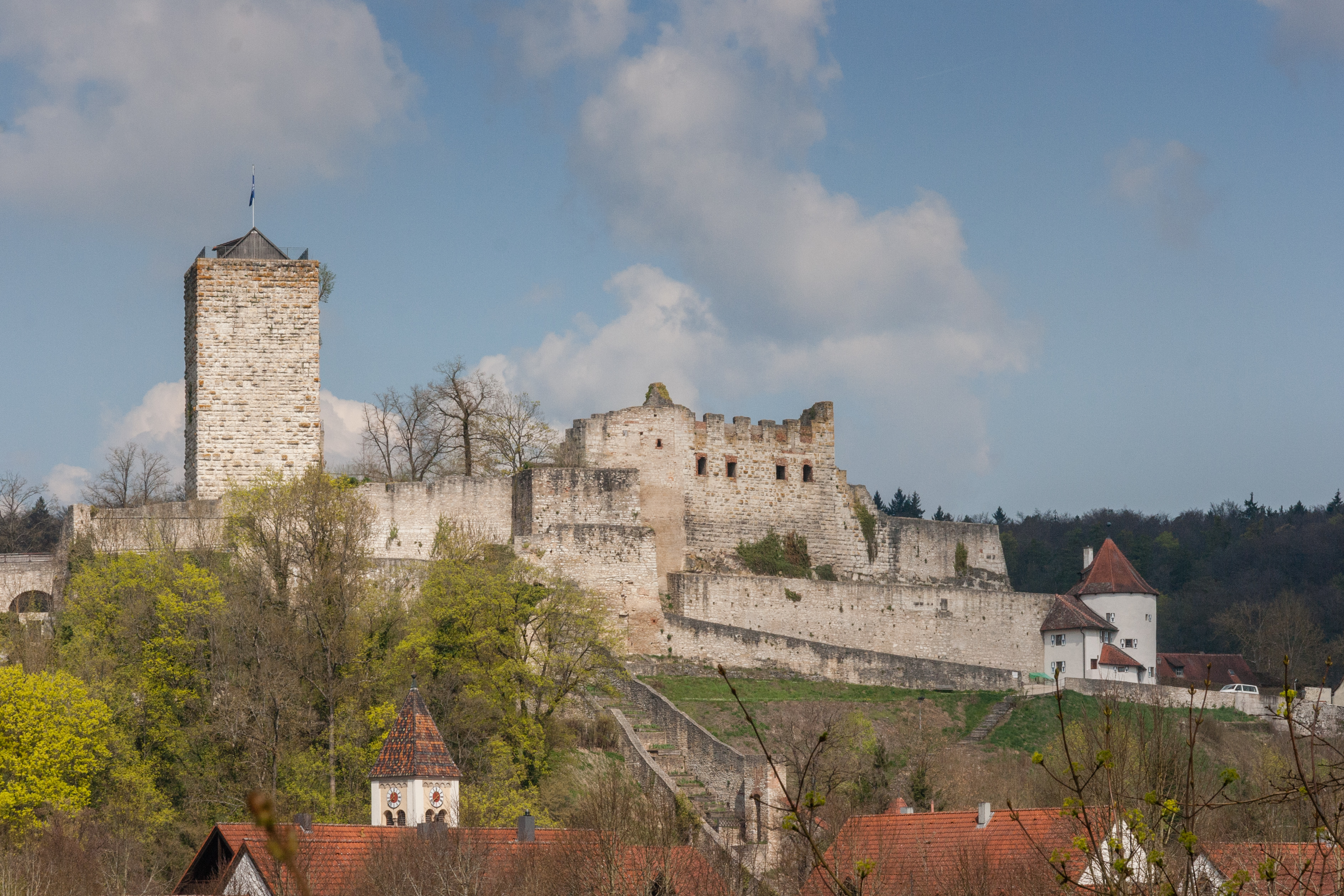
Pappenheim, the Old Castle of 1140

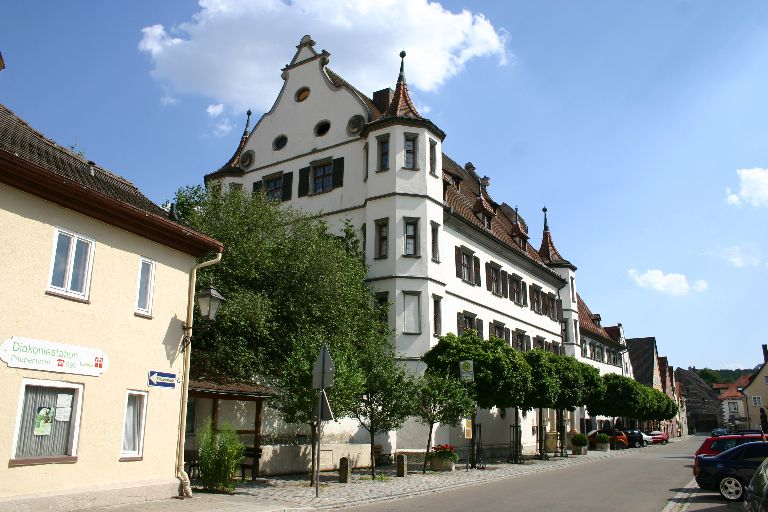
Pappenheim, the castle of 1593

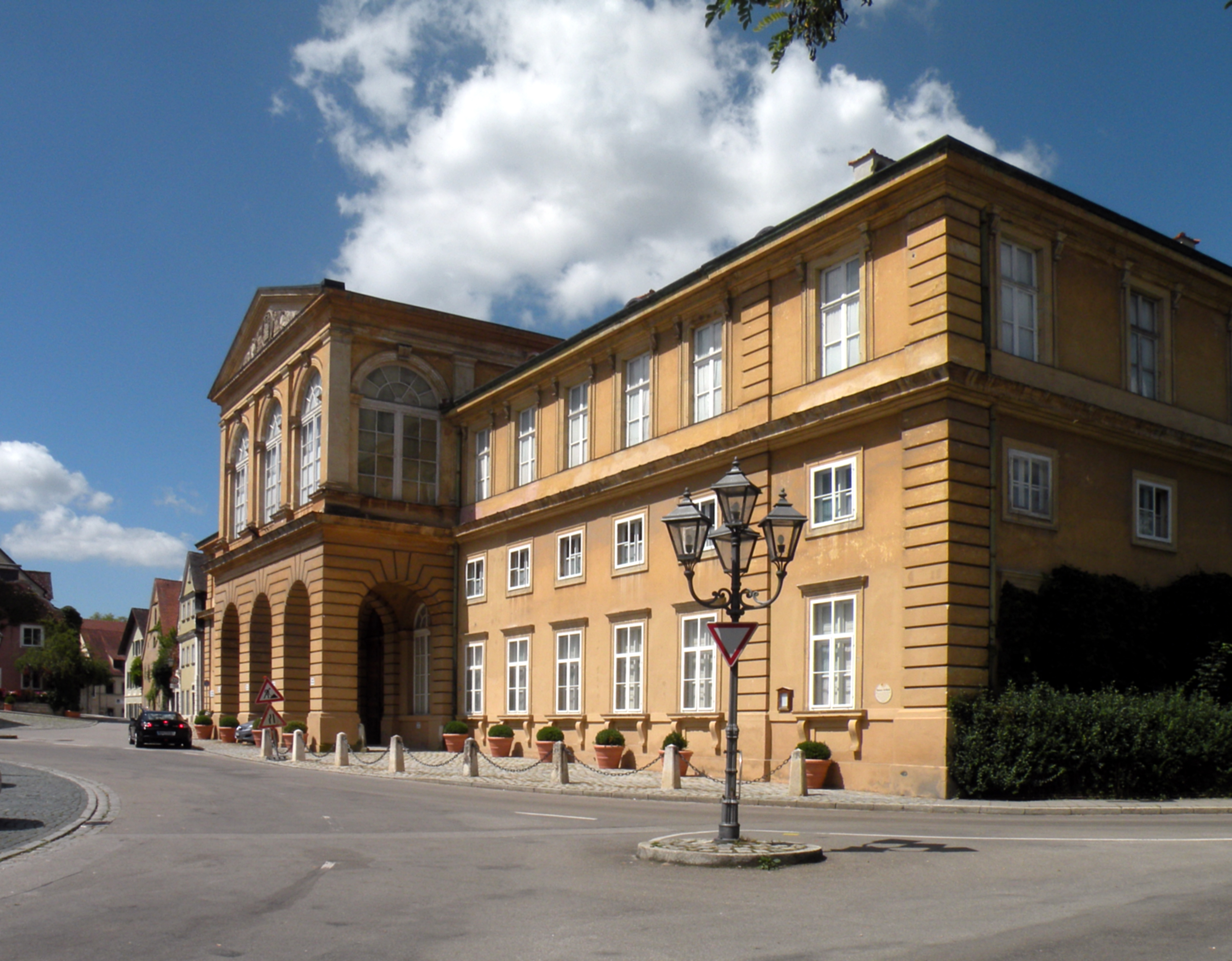
Pappenheim, the New Palace of 1819

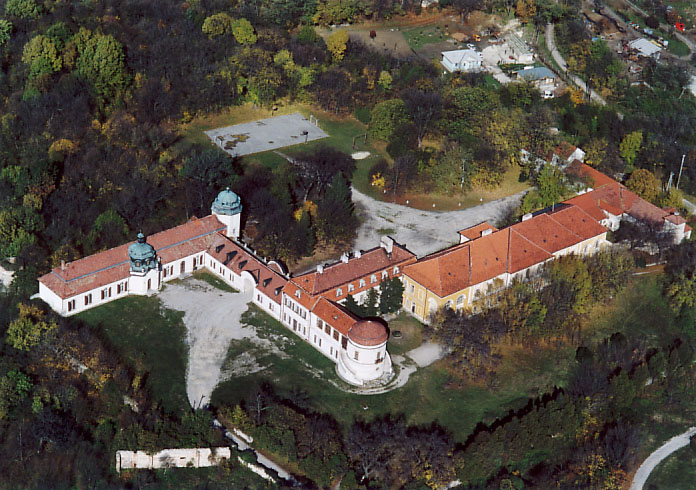
Iszkaszentgyörgy Palace, Hungary

== See also ==
- Pappenheim
