= Mieroszyno =

Mieroszyno Mierëszëno (Kashubian)
- Village
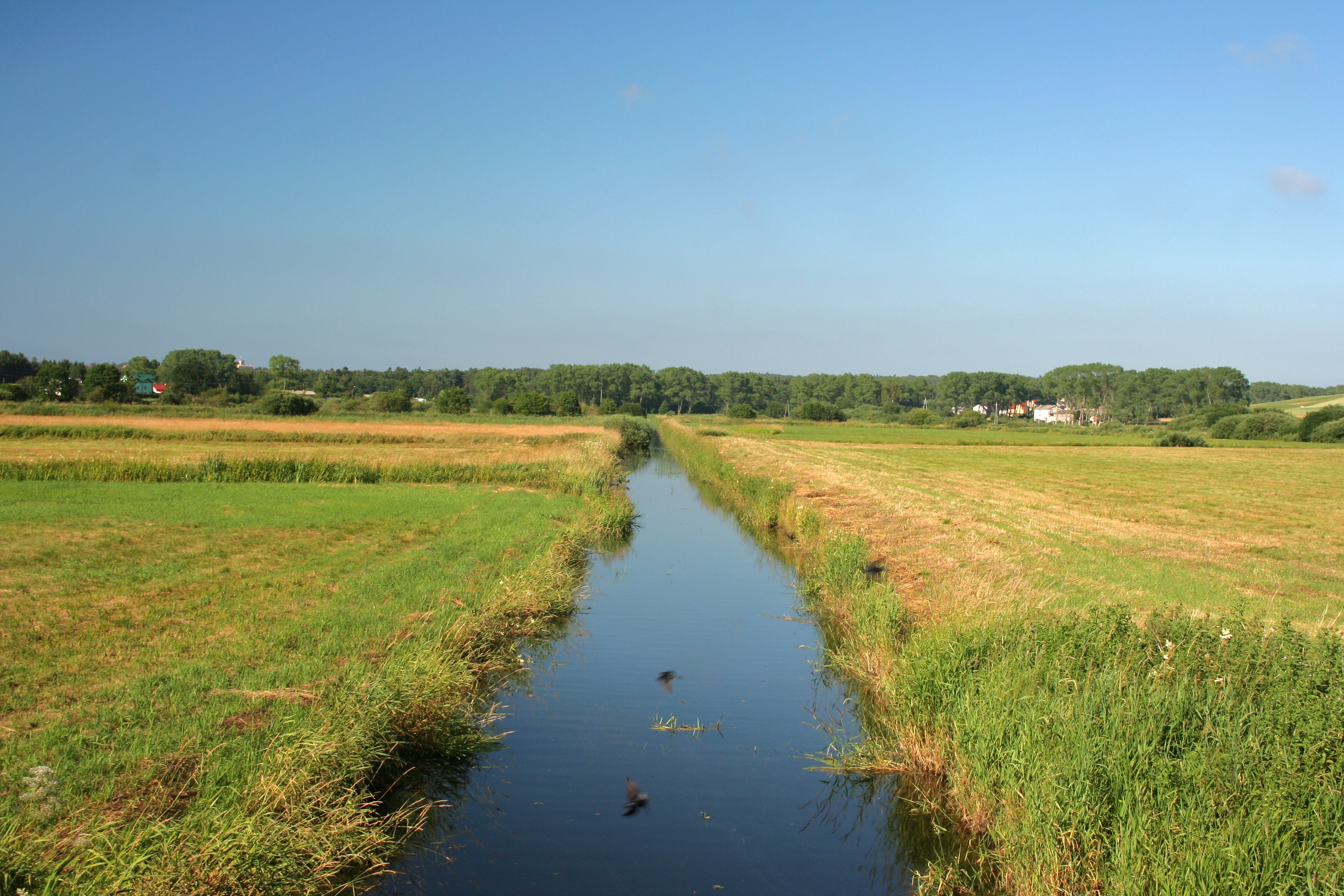
- Mieroszyno at Pucka Street Czarna Woda river Hannemann mausoleum 8th–6th century BCE kurgan Wind farm

- Location within Poland
- Coordinates: 54°47′56″N 18°18′47″E
- Country: Poland
- Voivodeship: Pomeranian
- County: Puck
- Gmina: Puck

Population (2021)
  - Total: 1 103
- Time zone: UTC+1 (CET)
  - Summer (DST): UTC+2 (CEST)
- Postal code: 84-103
- Vehicle registration: GPU
- Website: Sołectwo Mieroszyno

Mieroszyno (

Kashubian: Mierëszëno;

German: Miruschin) is a village in Kashubia, in northern Poland. It is located in the Pomeranian Voivodeship, in Puck County, within the Puck Muncipality.

Mieroszyno is the seat of the village council of Mieroszyno, which also covers Czarny Młyn and Kaczyniec. The village itself includes the integral localities Łyśniewo and Mieroszyno-Parcele. The village has holiday accommodation used during the summer season by visitors to Jastrzębia Góra.

== Name ==
The Geographical Dictionary of the Kingdom of Poland lists the Kashubian name Mierëszëno, the Polish forms Mieruszyn, Miruszyn, and Miruszyno, and the Germanised form Miruschin. The name is first recorded in a document from 1286, in which Prince Mściwój II granted the village to Jarosław, the judge of Puck.

During the Prussian Partition, the village was known by the German name Miruschin. In 1942, during the German occupation, the name was changed to Brünhausen. The change formed part of the German authorities' renaming of Kashubian and Polish place names.

== History ==
In the second half of the 16th century, Mieroszyno was a royal village in the Pomeranian Voivodeship, in Puck County.

During the German occupation of Poland (World War II), in 1942, several Polish families were expelled by the Germans, and enslaved as forced labour in the county.

Between 1954 and 1959, Mieroszyno belonged to and was the administrative centre of the Mieroszyno gromada. After its abolition, the village became part of the Strzelno gromada. From 1975 to 1998, it belonged to the Gdańsk Voivodeship.

== Integral parts of the village ==
Integral parts of the village of Mieroszyno
SIMC	Name	Type
0170564	Łyśniewo	hamlet
0170618	Mieroszyno-Parcele	hamlet
