= Celbowo =

- Village
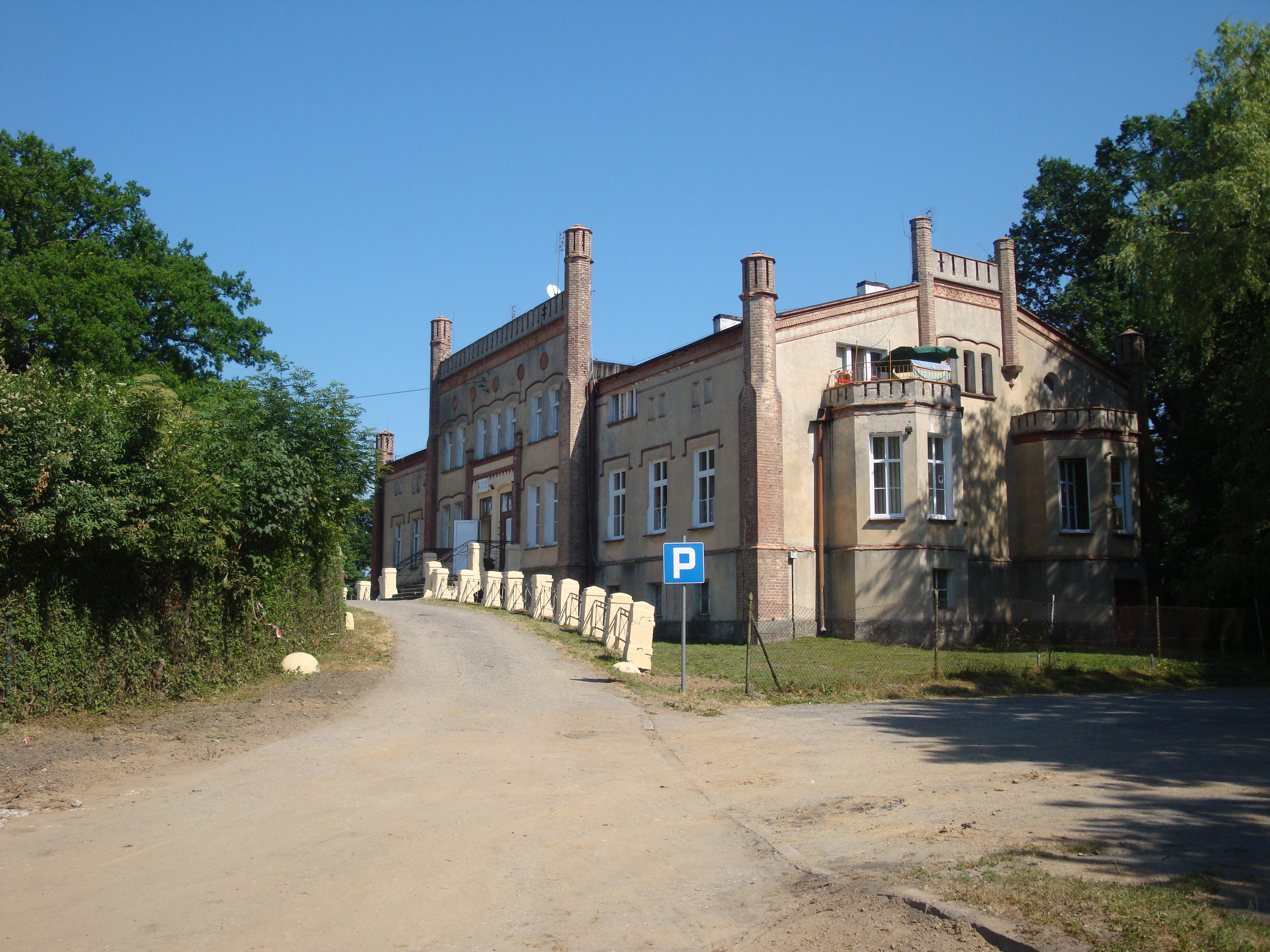
- Gothic Revival palace from the 19th century

- Location within Poland
- Coordinates: 54°41′15″N 18°22′34″E
- Country: Poland
- Voivodeship: Pomeranian
- County: Puck
- Gmina: Puck
- Population: 505 (2,010)
- Time zone: UTC+1 (CET)
  - Summer (DST): UTC+2 (CEST)
- Vehicle registration: GPU

Celbowo ([t͡sɛlˈbɔvɔ]; German: Celbau, 1942–45 Zelbau) is a village in the administrative district of Gmina Puck, within Puck County, Pomeranian Voivodeship, in northern Poland. It is located within the ethnocultural region of Kashubia in the historic region of Pomerania.

== History ==
Celbowo was a royal village of the Polish Crown, administratively located in the Puck County in the Pomeranian Voivodeship. The name of the village comes from the Old Polish male name Żelibor.

During the German occupation of Poland (World War II), in 1942, several Polish families were expelled, while their farms were handed over to German colonists as part of the Lebensraum policy. Poles were either deported to the Lublin District of the General Government or enslaved as forced labour to serve new German colonists in the county.
