= Gnieżdżewo =

Gnieżdżewo Gniéżdżewò
- Village
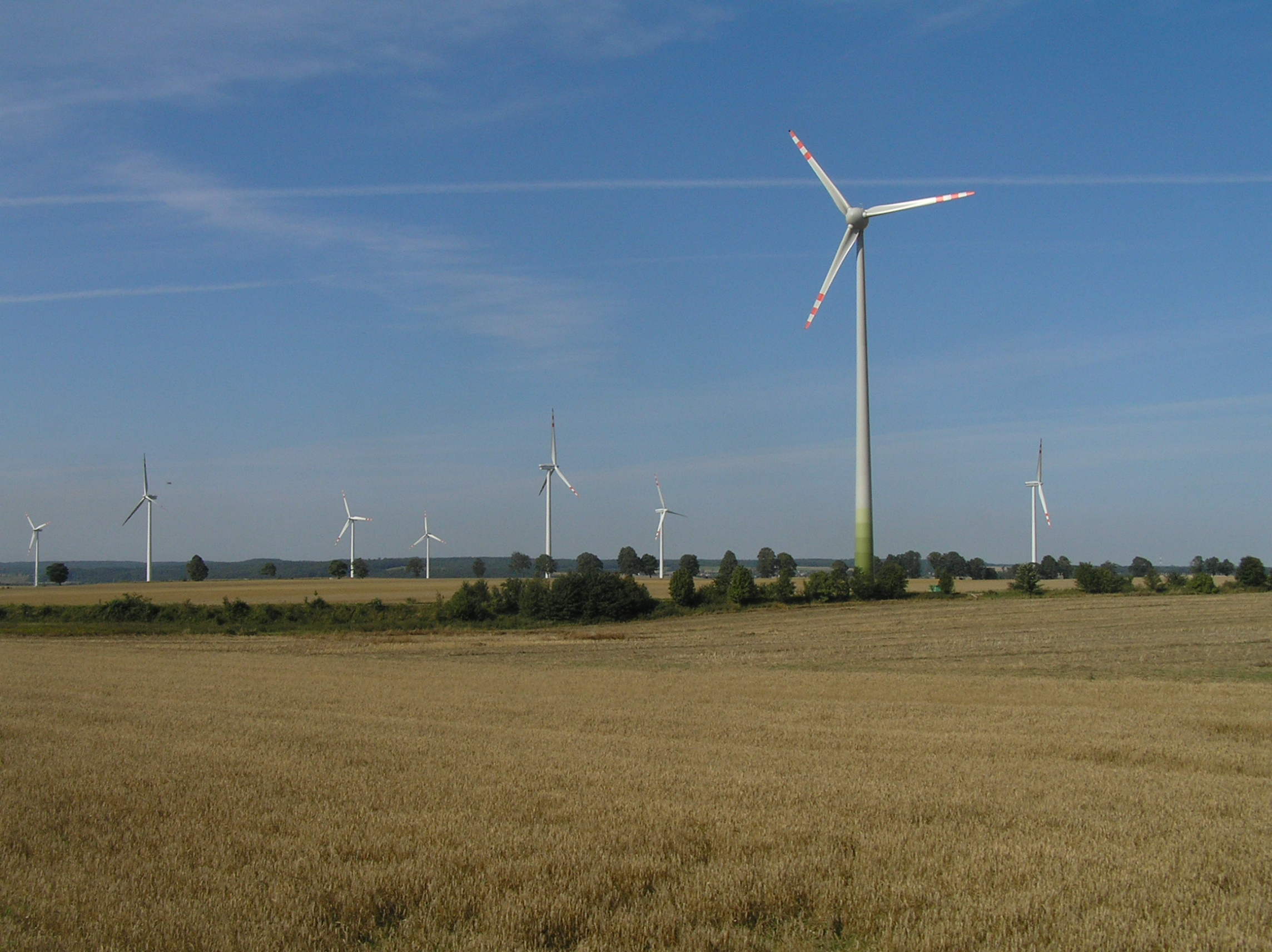
- Wind turbines in Gnieżdżewo

- Location within Poland
- Coordinates: 54°44′45″N 18°22′44″E
- Country: Poland
- Voivodeship: Pomeranian
- County: Puck
- Gmina: Puck
- Highest elevation: 50 m (160 ft)
- Lowest elevation: 30 m (98 ft)
- Population: 1,113
- Time zone: UTC+1 (CET)
  - Summer (DST): UTC+2 (CEST)
- Vehicle registration: GPU

Gnieżdżewo ([ɡɲɛʐˈd͡ʐɛvɔ]; German: Gnesdau, 1942–45 Nesten) is a village in the administrative district of Gmina Puck, within Puck County, Pomeranian Voivodeship, in northern Poland. It is located within the ethnocultural region of Kashubia in the historic region of Pomerania.

== History ==
The village was first mentioned in medieval documents in 1305. Gnieżdżewo was a royal village of the Polish Crown, administratively located in the Puck County in the Pomeranian Voivodeship. It was granted several privileges in the Late Middle Ages, which were confirmed by Polish Kings Sigismund II Augustus and Władysław IV Vasa in 1544 and 1633.

During the German occupation of Poland (World War II), in 1940, several Polish families were expelled, while their farms were handed over to German colonists as part of the Lebensraum policy.

== Notable people ==
Konstantyn Dominik, Polish Catholic priest, auxiliary bishop of Chełmno (now Pelplin) was born in Gnieżdżewo on 7 November 1870. He died during the German occupation of Poland (World War II) on 7 March 1942 in Gdańsk.
