= Leśniewo, Pomeranian Voivodeship =

Leśniewo
- Village
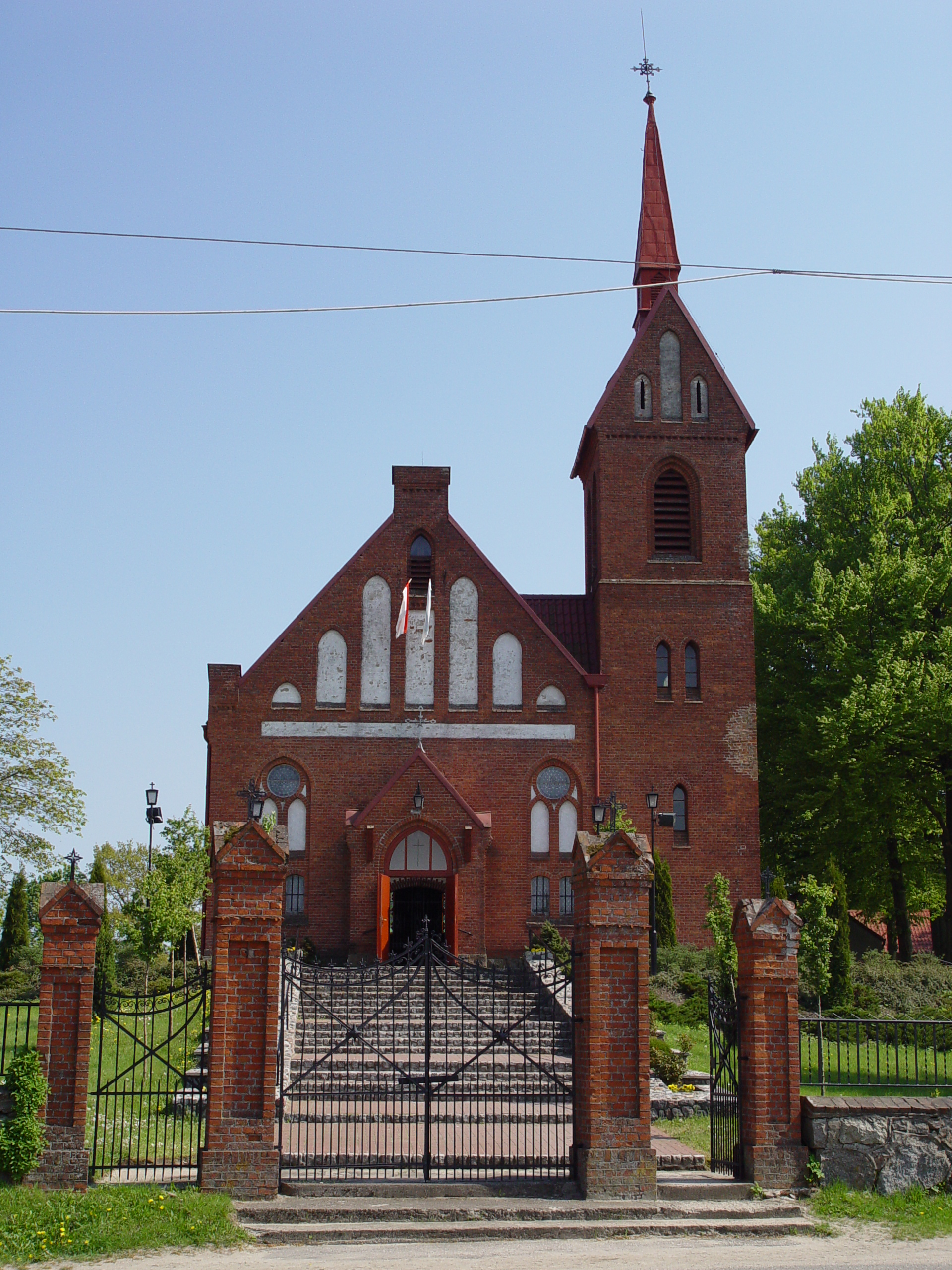
- Church of the Immaculate Heart of Mary in Leśniewo

- Location within Poland
- Coordinates: 54°41′39″N 18°14′24″E
- Country: Poland
- Voivodeship: Pomeranian
- County: Puck
- Gmina: Puck
- Population: 1,219
- Time zone: UTC+1 (CET)
  - Summer (DST): UTC+2 (CEST)
- Vehicle registration: GPU

Leśniewo ([lɛɕˈɲɛvɔ]; German: Leßnau) is a village in the administrative district of Gmina Puck, within Puck County, Pomeranian Voivodeship, in northern Poland. It is situated within Puszcza Darżlubska in the ethnocultural region of Kashubia in the historic region of Pomerania.

== History ==
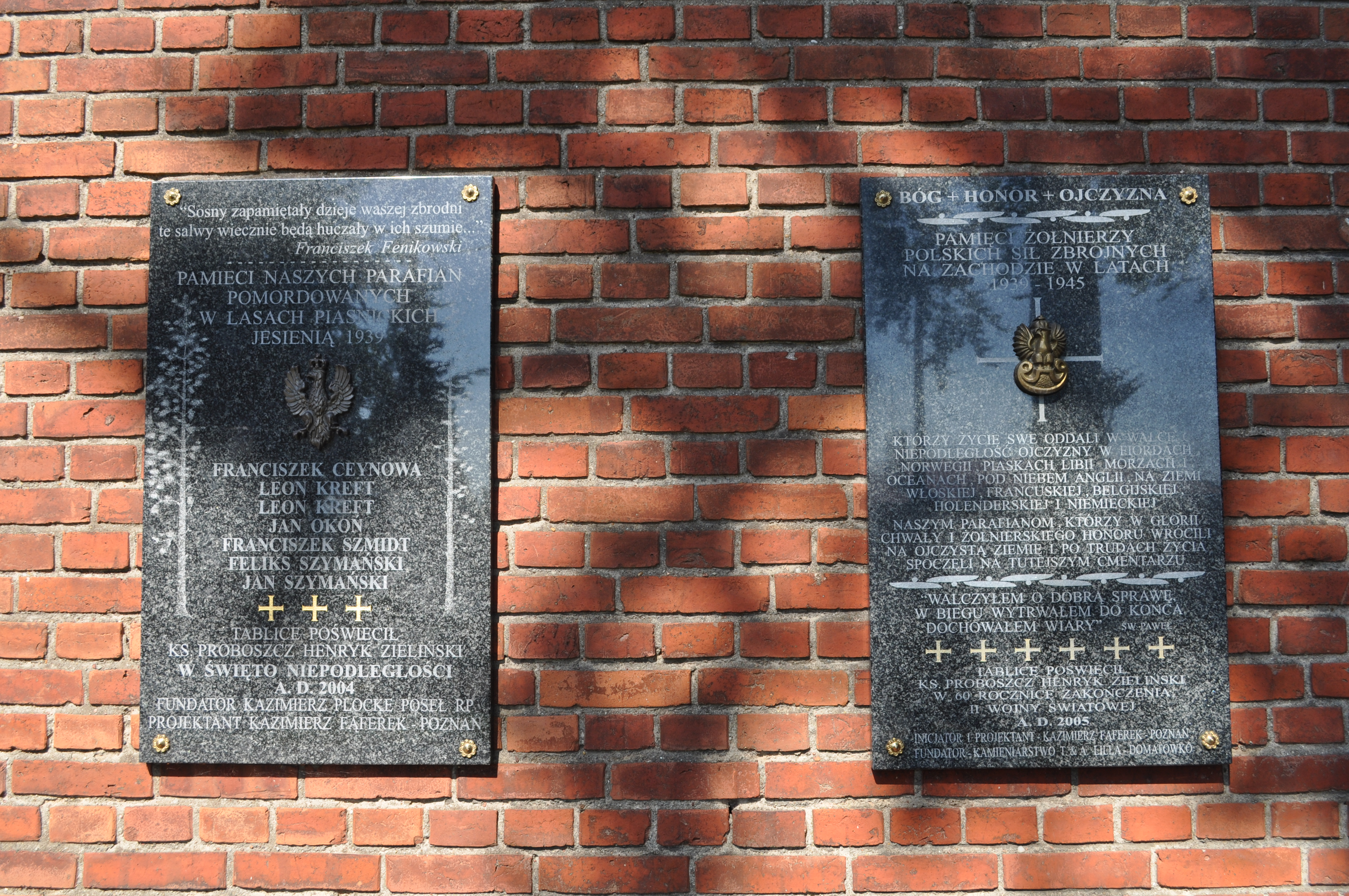
World War II memorials

In the 1920s Józef Dambek, the future leader of the Kashubian Griffin and Pomeranian Griffin, major Polish resistance organizations in the region during the German occupation, worked as a teacher at the local elementary school. The school is now named after him.

During the German occupation of Poland (World War II), Leśniewo was one of the sites of executions of Poles, carried out by the Germans in 1939 as part of the Intelligenzaktion. Several local farmers were among Poles murdered on November 8, 1939, during the large massacres in Piaśnica. In 1942, the occupiers carried out expulsions of Poles, who were enslaved as forced labour of new German colonists in the region.
