= Połczyno, Pomeranian Voivodeship =

Połczyno
- Village
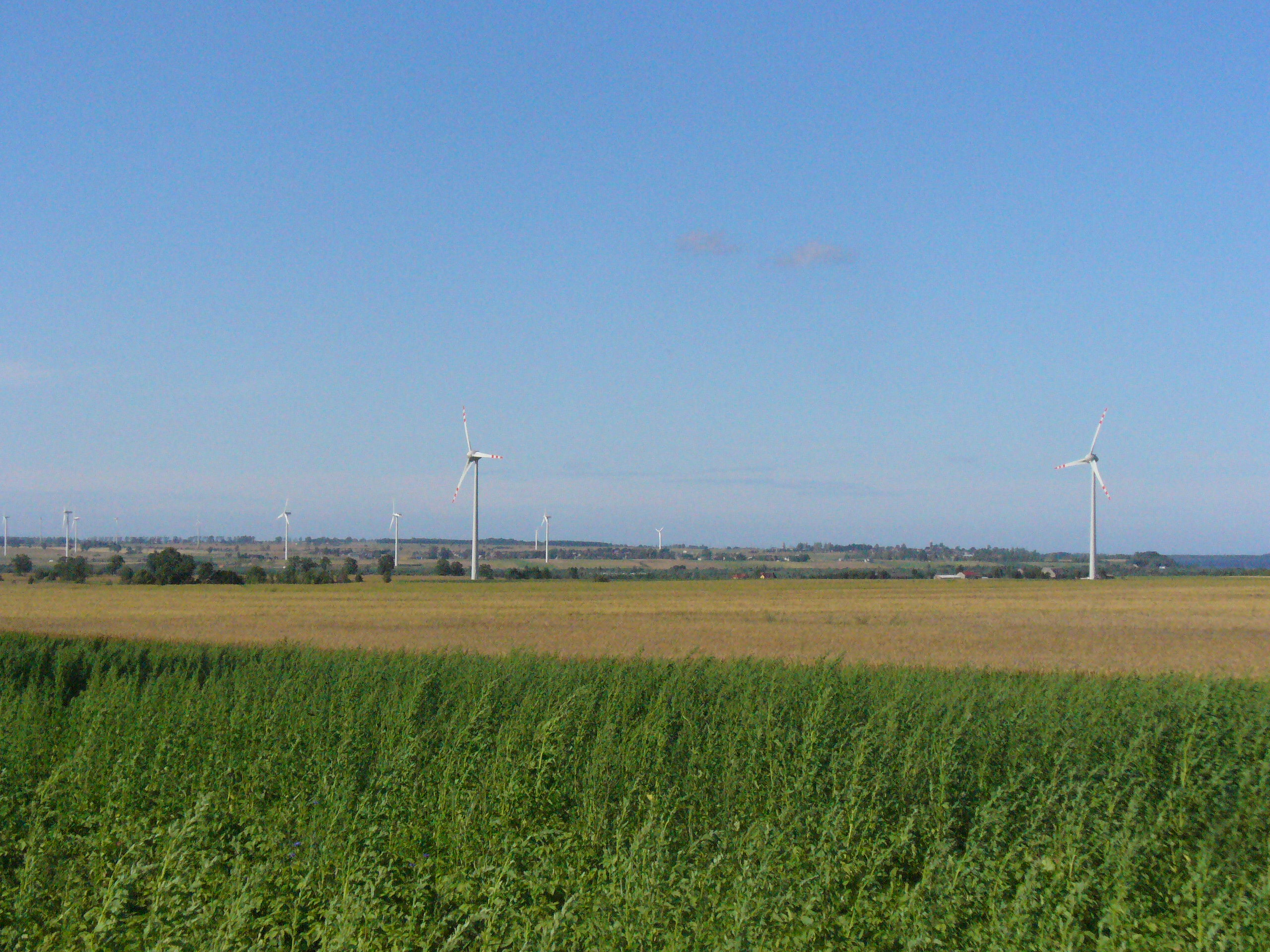
- Fields in Połczyno

- Location within Poland
- Coordinates: 54°42′30″N 18°21′23″E
- Country: Poland
- Voivodeship: Pomeranian
- County: Puck
- Gmina: Puck
- Population (2024): 1,590
- Time zone: UTC+1 (CET)
  - Summer (DST): UTC+2 (CEST)
- Vehicle registration: GPU

Połczyno ([pɔu̯ˈt͡ʂɨnɔ]; German: Polzin, 1942–45 Konradswiese) is a village in the administrative district of Gmina Puck, within Puck County, Pomeranian Voivodeship, in northern Poland. It is located within the ethnocultural region of Kashubia in the historic region of Pomerania.

== History ==
Połczyno was a royal village of the Polish Crown, administratively located in the Puck County in the Pomeranian Voivodeship. There is a primary school in Połczyno, founded in 1750.

During the German occupation of Poland (World War II), in 1939 and 1940, the Germans expelled several Polish families, whose farms were then handed over to German colonists as part of the Lebensraum policy.
