= Kazimierz Plocke =

Polish politician (born 1958)

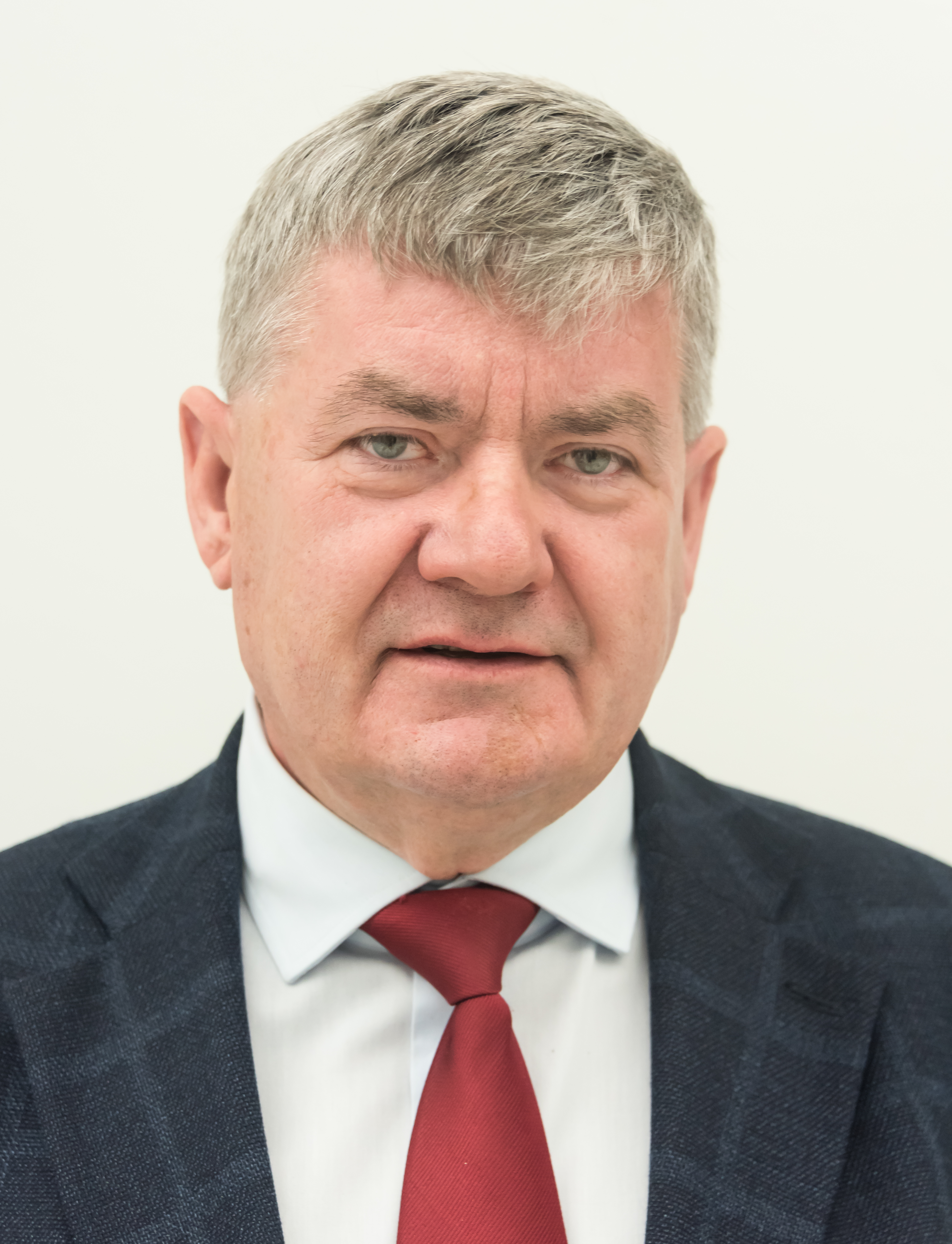

member of Sejm 2005-2007
- Incumbent
- Assumed office 19 October 2001

Personal details
- Born: 3 May 1958 (age 67)
- Party: Civic Platform

Kazimierz Florian Plocke (born 3 May 1958 in Domatowo, Kashubia) is a Polish politician. He was elected to the Sejm on 25 September 2005, getting 9,579 votes in 26 Gdynia district as a candidate from the Civic Platform list. He speaks fluent Kashubian language.

He was also a member of Sejm 2001-2005.

== See also ==
- Members of Polish Sejm 2005-2007
