= Brudzewo, Pomeranian Voivodeship =

Brudzewo
- Village
- Location within Poland
- Coordinates: 54°41′9″N 18°21′15″E
- Country: Poland
- Voivodeship: Pomeranian
- County: Puck
- Gmina: Puck
- Population: 212
- Time zone: UTC+1 (CET)
  - Summer (DST): UTC+2 (CEST)
- Vehicle registration: GPU

Brudzewo ([bruˈd͡zɛvɔ]; German: Brusdau) is a village in the administrative district of Gmina Puck, within Puck County, Pomeranian Voivodeship, in northern Poland. It is located within the ethnocultural region of Kashubia in the historic region of Pomerania.

== History ==
Brudzewo was a royal village of the Polish Crown, administratively located in the Puck County in the Pomeranian Voivodeship.

During the German occupation of Poland (World War II), local teachers were among Polish teachers murdered in the Mauthausen concentration camp (see Intelligenzaktion).
