= Żelistrzewo =

- Village
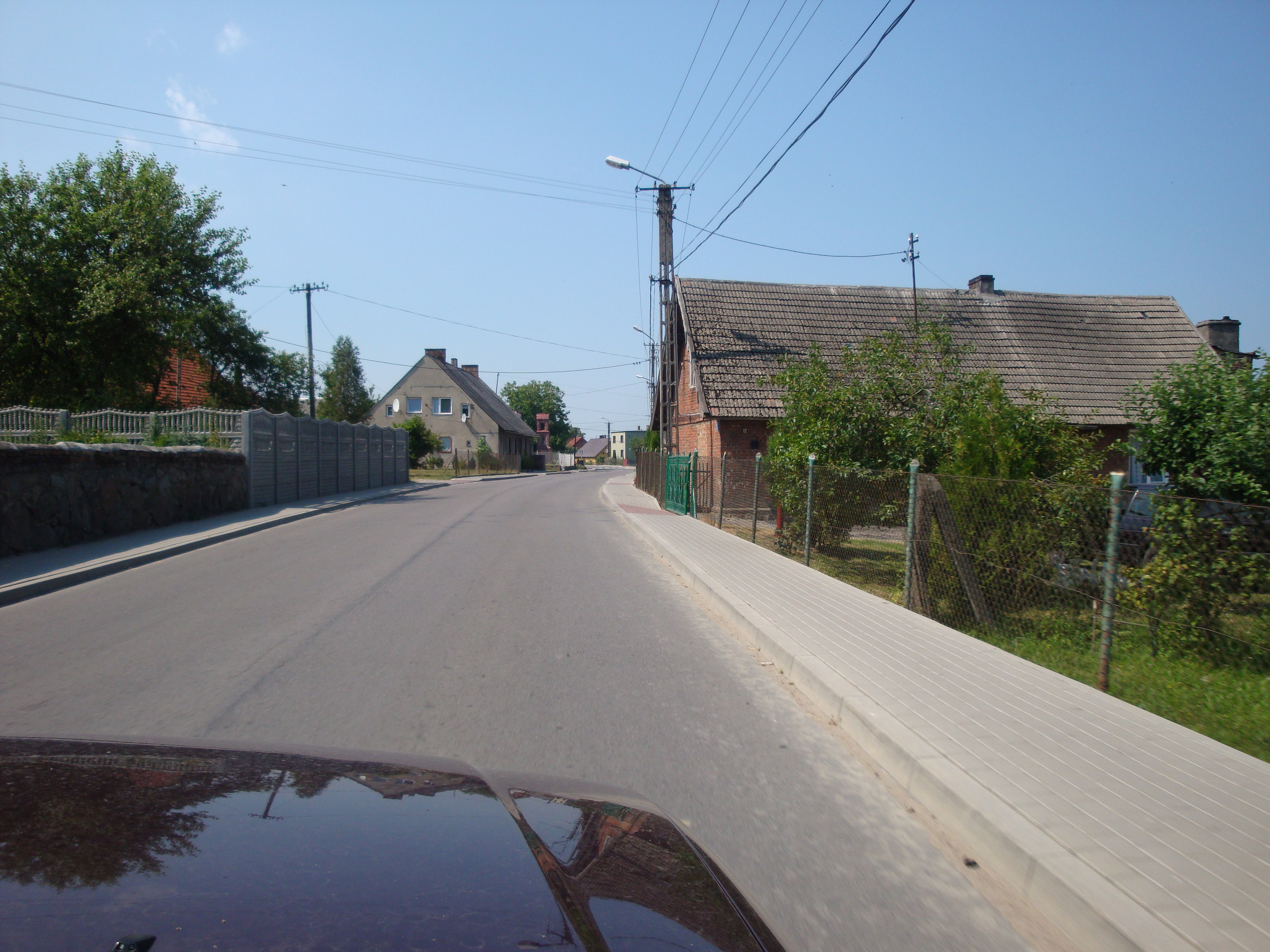

- Location within Poland
- Coordinates: 54°40′38″N 18°25′10″E
- Country: Poland
- Voivodeship: Pomeranian
- County: Puck
- Gmina: Puck
- Population: over 3,000
- Time zone: UTC+1 (CET)
  - Summer (DST): UTC+2 (CEST)
- Vehicle registration: GPU

Żelistrzewo ([ʐɛlisˈtʂɛvɔ]; German: Sellistrau, 1942–45 Sellen) is a village in the administrative district of Gmina Puck, within Puck County, Pomeranian Voivodeship, in northern Poland. It is located in the ethnocultural region of Kashubia in the historic region of Pomerania.

== History ==
Żelistrzewo was a private village of the Czarliński noble family of Sówka coat of arms, administratively located in the Puck County in the Pomeranian Voivodeship of the Kingdom of Poland. It was annexed by Prussia in the First Partition of Poland in 1772. Following World War I, Poland regained independence and control of the village.

During the German occupation of Poland (World War II), Żelistrzewo was one of the sites of executions of Poles, carried out by the Germans in 1939 as part of the Intelligenzaktion. Local teachers were among the victims of the large massacres in Piaśnica, also perpetrated by the Germans in 1939 as part of the Intelligenzaktion. In 1939, 1940 and 1942, the occupiers also carried out expulsions of Poles, who were afterwards either deported to the General Government in the more eastern part of German-occupied Poland, or sent to forced labour in the county and other regions. Houses of expelled Poles were handed over to German colonists as part of the Lebensraum policy.

== Transport ==
There is a train station in Żelistrzewo.
