= Rzucewo Castle =

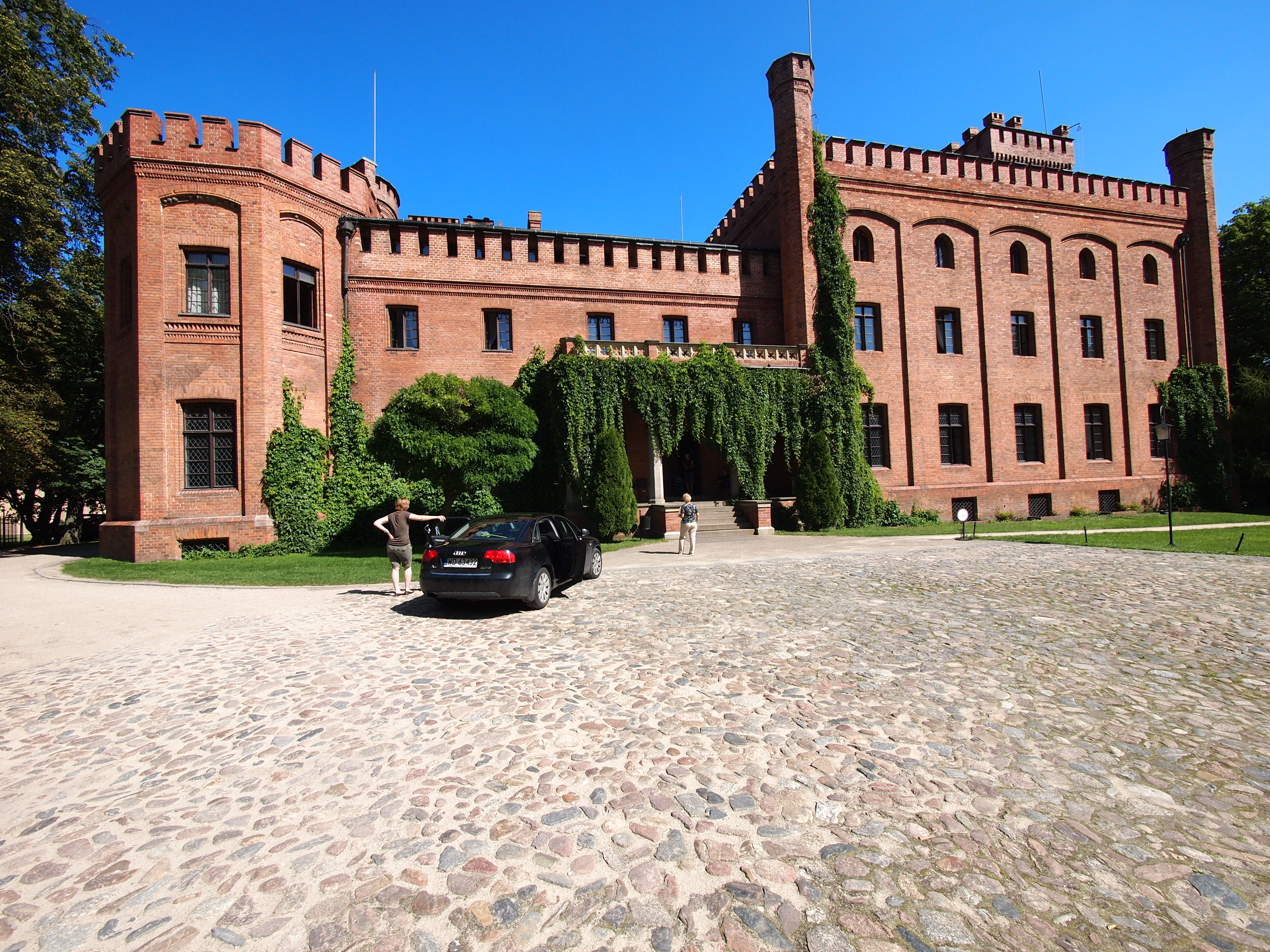
- Rzucewo, one of the most recognizable landmarks in Pomerania

- Location within Poland
- Coordinates: 54°41′9″N 18°27′44″E
- Country: Poland
- Voivodeship: Pomeranian
- County: Puck
- Gmina: Gmina Puck
- Time zone: UTC+1 (CET)
  - Summer (DST): UTC+2 (CEST)
- Website: www.zameksobieski.pl

Rzucewo Castle (German: Schloß Rutzau) is a castle (also known as the Jan III Sobieski Castle) situated in Rzucewo, in the Pomeranian Voivodeship, Poland.

== History ==
Prior to 1308 the area was owned by Pomeranian Dukes. Since then it has been owned by and was the residence of the aristocratic families of Wejher, Radziwill, and the former residence of King of Poland John III Sobieski.

In 1840, Gustav von Below then founded the castle, and was designed by Friedrich August Stüler. It was owned by the family until 1945, when communists conquered the land and it was turned into an agriculture school and then after two years of refurbishments, in 1994 it was turned into a hotel.
