= Sikorzyno, Puck County =

Sikorzyno
- Village
- Location within Poland
- Coordinates: 54°40′53″N 18°16′37″E
- Country: Poland
- Voivodeship: Pomeranian
- County: Puck
- Gmina: Puck
- Time zone: UTC+1 (CET)
  - Summer (DST): UTC+2 (CEST)

Sikorzyno [ɕikɔˈʐɨnɔ] is a village in the administrative district of Gmina Puck, within Puck County, Pomeranian Voivodeship, in northern Poland. It is located in the ethnocultural region of Kashubia in the historic region of Pomerania.
