= Celbówko =

- Village
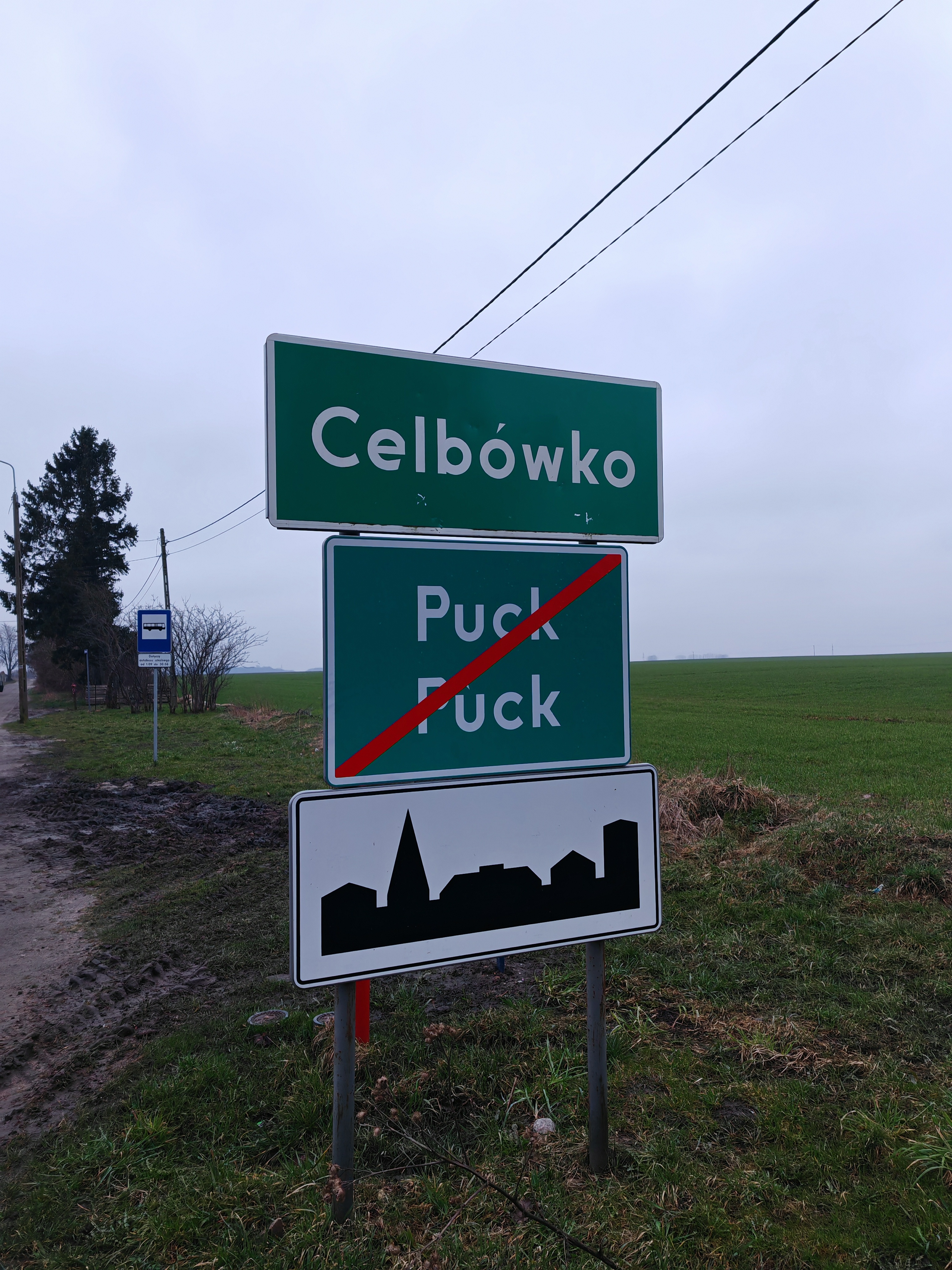

- Location within Poland
- Coordinates: 54°42′17″N 18°23′34″E
- Country: Poland
- Voivodeship: Pomeranian
- County: Puck
- Gmina: Puck
- Population: 82

Celbówko ([t͡sɛlˈbufkɔ]; German: Tannenburg) is a village in the administrative district of Gmina Puck, within Puck County, Pomeranian Voivodeship, in northern Poland.

== See also ==
- History of Pomerania
