= Strzelno, Pomeranian Voivodeship =

Strzelno
- Village
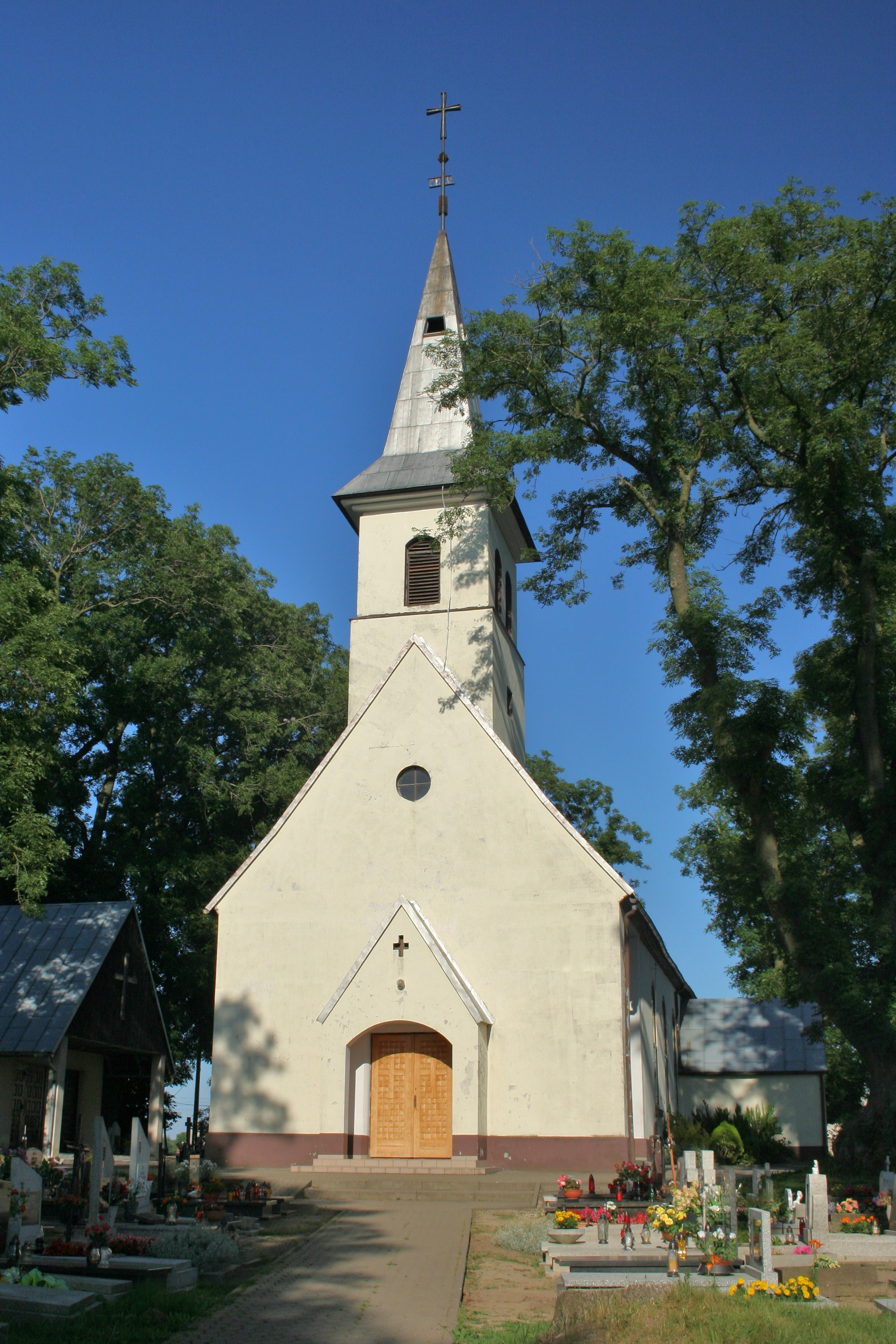
- Saint Mary Magdalene church in Strzelno

- Location within Poland
- Coordinates: 54°47′7″N 18°19′29″E
- Country: Poland
- Voivodeship: Pomeranian
- County: Puck
- Gmina: Puck
- Population: 1,063
- Time zone: UTC+1 (CET)
  - Summer (DST): UTC+2 (CEST)
- Vehicle registration: GPU

Strzelno ([ˈstʂɛlnɔ]; German: Strellin) is a village in the administrative district of Gmina Puck, within Puck County, Pomeranian Voivodeship, in northern Poland. It is located within the ethnocultural region of Kashubia in the historic region of Pomerania.

Strzelno was a royal village of the Polish Crown, administratively located in the Puck County in the Pomeranian Voivodeship.
