= Sławutowo =

- Village
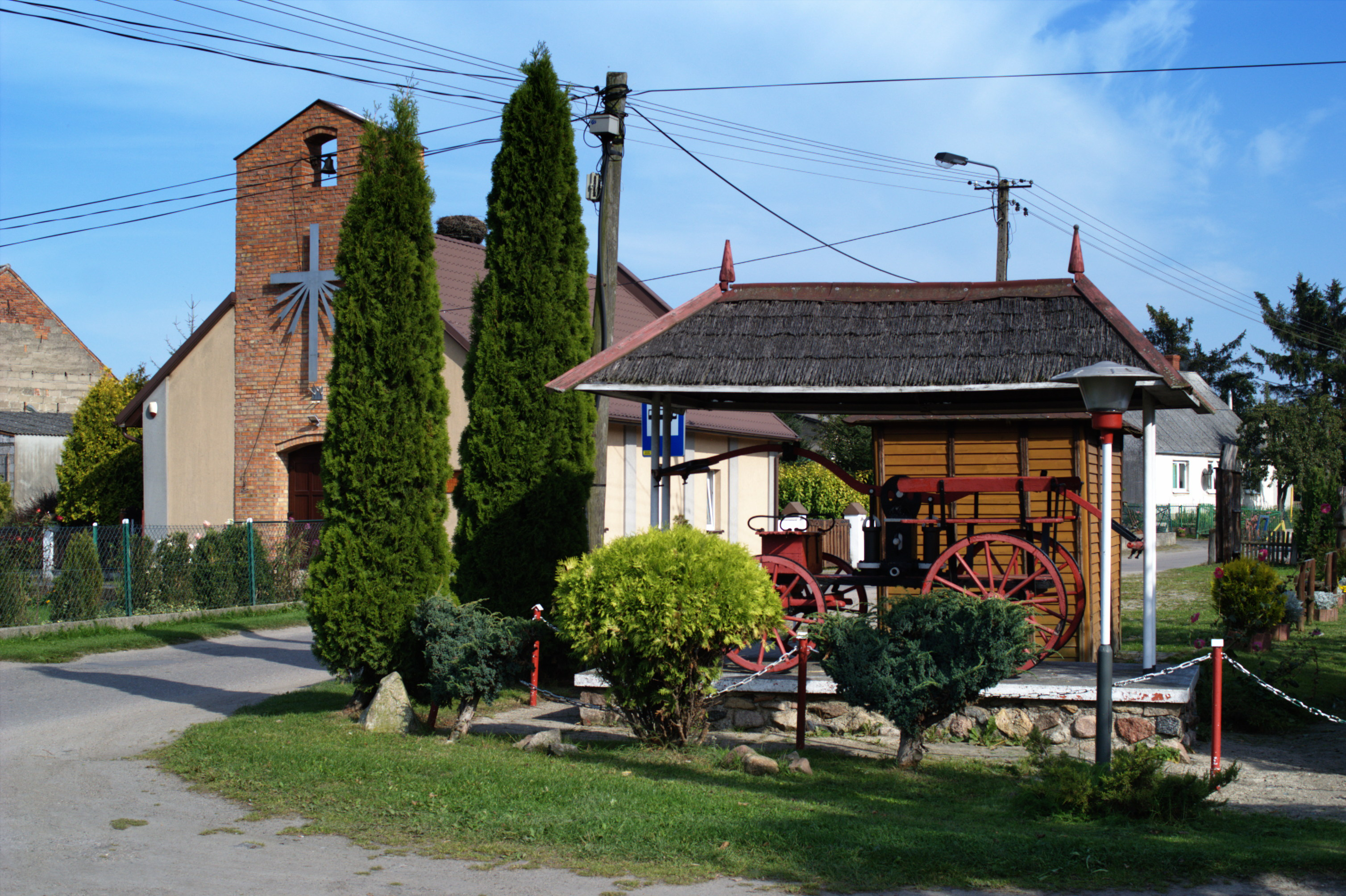

- Location within Poland
- Coordinates: 54°40′13″N 18°20′35″E
- Country: Poland
- Voivodeship: Pomeranian
- County: Puck
- Gmina: Puck
- Population: 225

Sławutowo ([swavuˈtɔvɔ]; German: Groß Schlatau, 1942–45 Großschlatau) is a village in the administrative district of Gmina Puck, within Puck County, Pomeranian Voivodeship, in northern Poland.

For details of the history of the region, see History of Pomerania.
