= Widlino, Puck County =

Widlino
- Village
- Location within Poland
- Coordinates: 54°39′12″N 18°21′17″E
- Country: Poland
- Voivodeship: Pomeranian
- County: Puck
- Gmina: Puck
- Population: 51

Widlino ([viˈdlinɔ]; German: Wedlin) is a village in the administrative district of Gmina Puck, within Puck County, Pomeranian Voivodeship, in northern Poland.

For details of the history of the region, see History of Pomerania.
