= Pustki, Puck County =

Pustki
- Village
- Location within Poland
- Coordinates: 54°46′28″N 18°19′50″E
- Country: Poland
- Voivodeship: Pomeranian
- County: Puck
- Gmina: Puck

Pustki [ˈpustki] is a village in the administrative district of Gmina Puck, within Puck County, Pomeranian Voivodeship, in northern Poland.

== See also ==
- History of Pomerania
