= Domatowo =

- Village
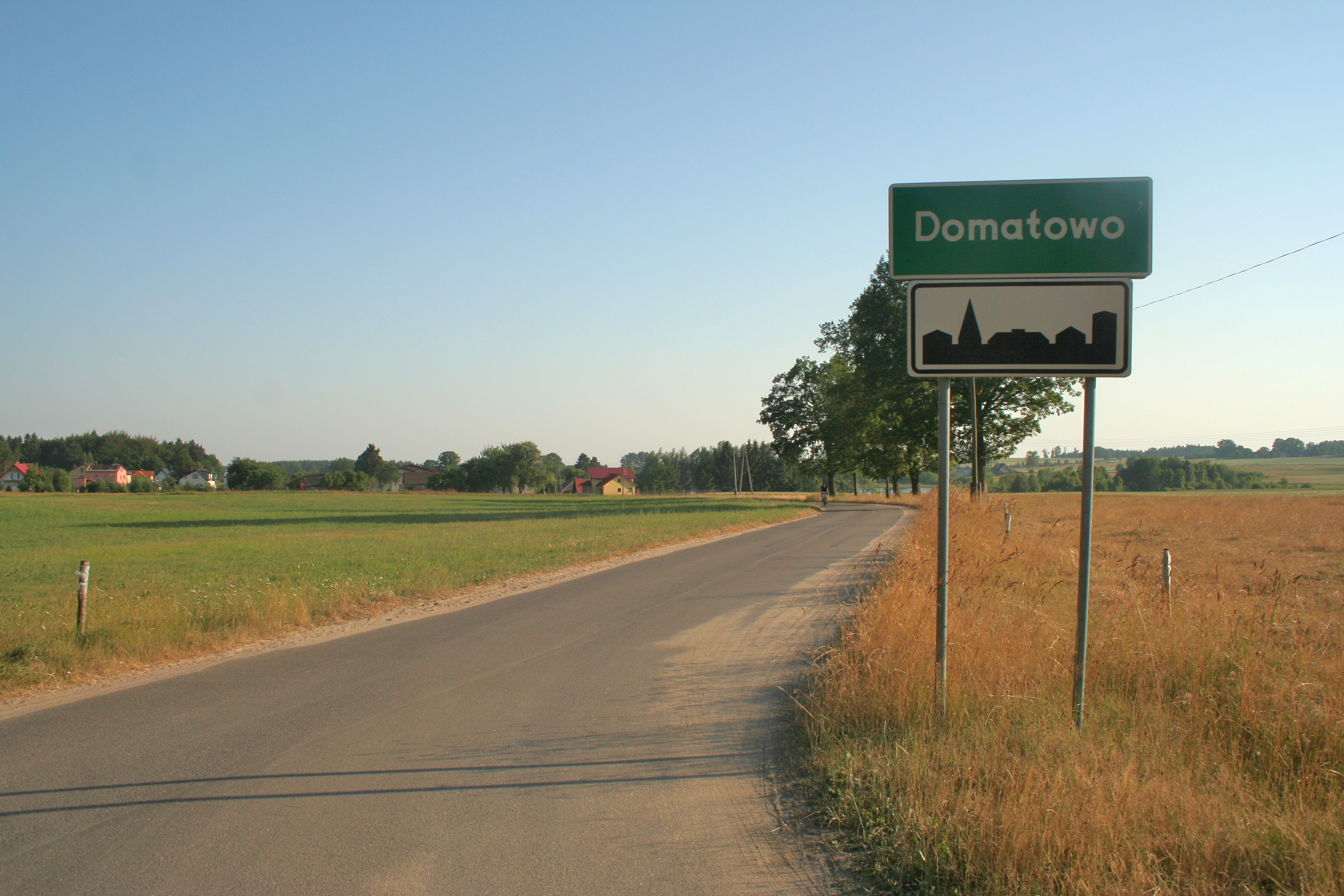

- Location within Poland
- Coordinates: 54°43′N 18°14′E
- Country: Poland
- Voivodeship: Pomeranian
- County: Puck
- Gmina: Puck
- Population: 700
- Time zone: UTC+1 (CET)
  - Summer (DST): UTC+2 (CEST)

Domatowo ([dɔmaˈtɔvɔ]; German: Groß Dommatau, 1942–45 Großdommatau) is a village in the administrative district of Gmina Puck, within Puck County, Pomeranian Voivodeship, Kashubia in northern Poland. It is located within the historical region of Pomerania.

Domatowo was a private church village within the Polish Crown, administratively located in the Puck County in the Pomeranian Voivodeship, owned by the monastery in Oliwa.

During the German occupation of Poland (World War II), the Germans murdered seven Poles in Domatowo in October 1939. Polish farmers from Domatowo were imprisoned in nearby Puck, and on November 3, 1939, murdered in the Piasnica massacre.
