= Muza =

Muza may refer to:

== Places ==
- Muza, Pomeranian Voivodeship, a village Poland
- Mawza District or Muza, a district of the Taiz Governorate, Yemen
- Muza Emporion, an ancient emporion on the Arabian coast of the Red Sea in modern Yemen
- MUŻA, an art museum in Valletta, Malta

== Music ==
- Polskie Nagrania Muza, a Polish record label
- "Muza" (song), by BQL, 2016
- Muza, an album by Martin Vučić, or the title song

== People ==
- Muza Krepkogorskaya (1924–1999), Soviet and Russian actress
- Muza Niyazova (born 1938), former First Lady of Turkmenistan
- Mūza Rubackytė (born 1959), Lithuanian pianist

== See also ==
- Muza Kawasaki Symphony Hall, a concert hall in Kawasaki, Kanagawa, Japan
