= Moście Błota =

- Settlement
- Location within Poland
- Coordinates: 54°38′42″N 18°23′51″E
- Country: Poland
- Voivodeship: Pomeranian
- County: Puck
- Gmina: Puck
- Population: 101

Moście Błota [ˈmɔɕt͡ɕɛ ˈbwɔta] is a settlement in the administrative district of Gmina Puck, within Puck County, Pomeranian Voivodeship, in northern Poland.

== See also ==
- History of Pomerania
