= Domatówko =

- Village
- Location within Poland
- Coordinates: 54°41′17″N 18°12′41″E
- Country: Poland
- Voivodeship: Pomeranian
- County: Puck
- Gmina: Puck
- Population: 407

Domatówko ([dɔmaˈtufkɔ]; German: Klein Dommatau, 1942–45 Kleindommatau) is a village in the administrative district of Gmina Puck, within Puck County, Pomeranian Voivodeship, in northern Poland.

== See also ==
- History of Pomerania
