= Beka, Pomeranian Voivodeship =

Beka
- Settlement
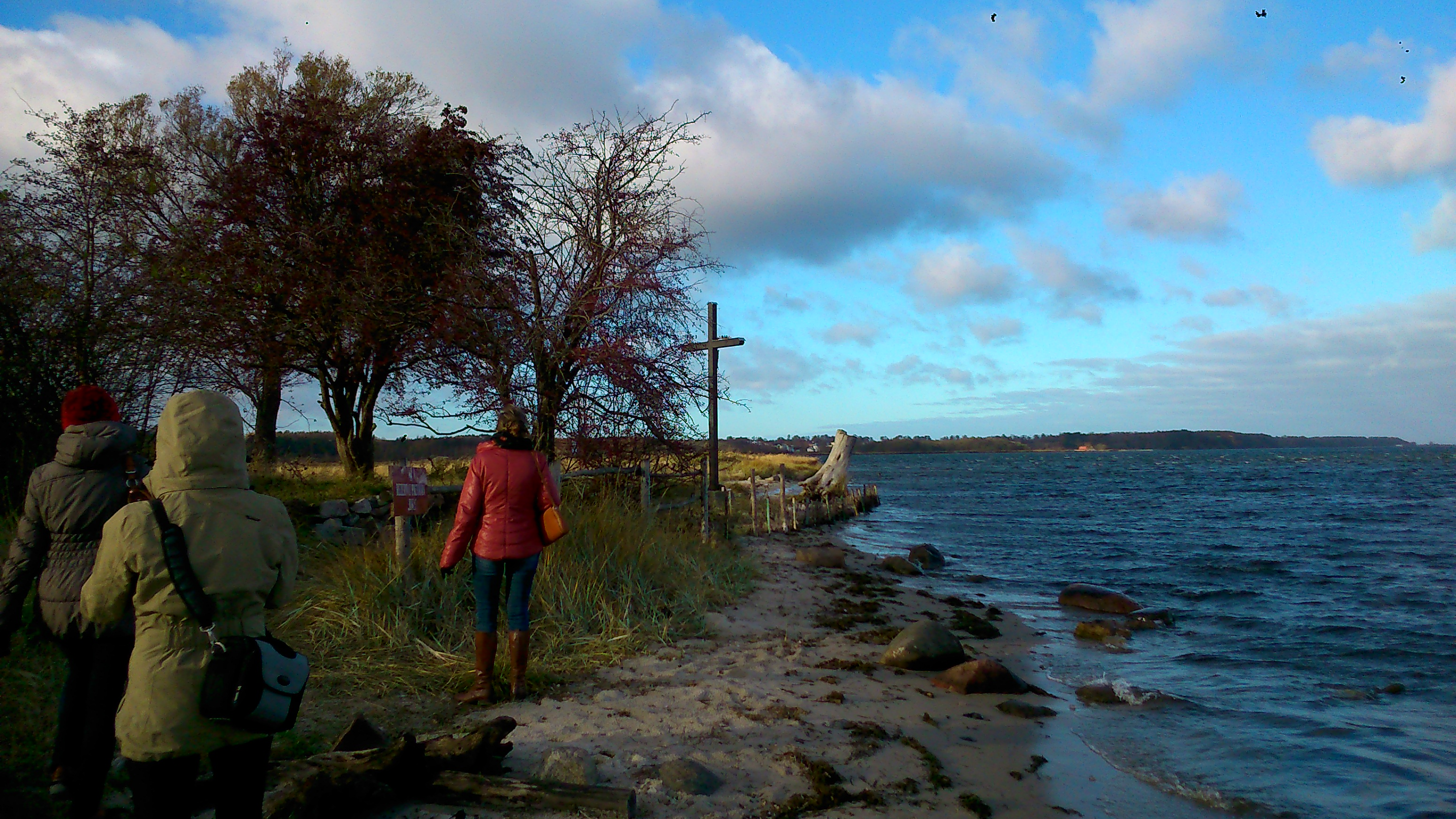
- Only trees and some stones remain from village. Cross erected for memory.

- Location within Poland
- Coordinates: 54°39′04″N 18°28′22″E
- Country: Poland
- Voivodeship: Pomeranian
- County: Puck
- Gmina: Puck

Beka [ˈbɛka] was a settlement in the administrative district of Gmina Puck, within Puck County, Pomeranian Voivodeship, in northern Poland.

The first mention of the village was in 1523. Due to engineering of the river Reda in the 19th century, the sea-shore was changed and the village often flooded. This caused its population to decrease. After a fire in 1960 the village was abandoned.

== See also ==
- History of Pomerania
