= Połchowo, Pomeranian Voivodeship =

Połchowo
- Village
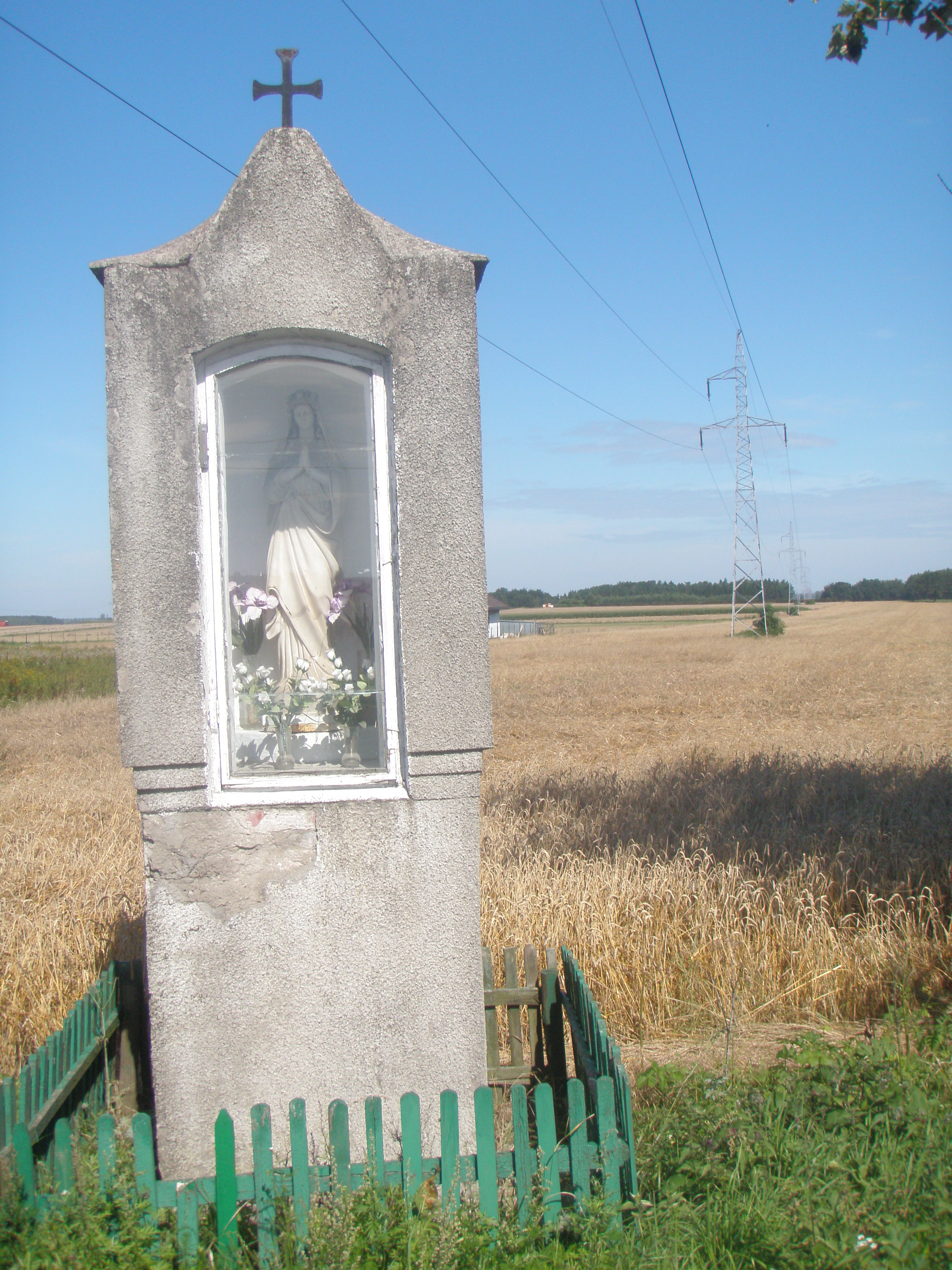
- Wayside shrine in Połchowo

- Location within Poland
- Coordinates: 54°38′54″N 18°22′20″E
- Country: Poland
- Voivodeship: Pomeranian
- County: Puck
- Gmina: Puck
- Population: 1,113
- Time zone: UTC+1 (CET)
  - Summer (DST): UTC+2 (CEST)
- Vehicle registration: GPU

Połchowo ([pɔu̯ˈxɔvɔ]; German: Polchau) is a village in the administrative district of Gmina Puck, within Puck County, Pomeranian Voivodeship, in northern Poland. It is located within the ethnocultural region of Kashubia in the historic region of Pomerania.

== History ==
Połchowo was a royal village of the Polish Crown, administratively located in the Puck County in the Pomeranian Voivodeship.

During the German occupation of Poland (World War II), in 1940 and 1942, the Germans expelled several Polish families, whose farms were then handed over to German colonists as part of the Lebensraum policy.

== Sport ==
Established in 1949, the village is represented by the football club Kaszuby Połchowo who compete in Klasa B.
