= Smolno, Pomeranian Voivodeship =

Smolno
- Village
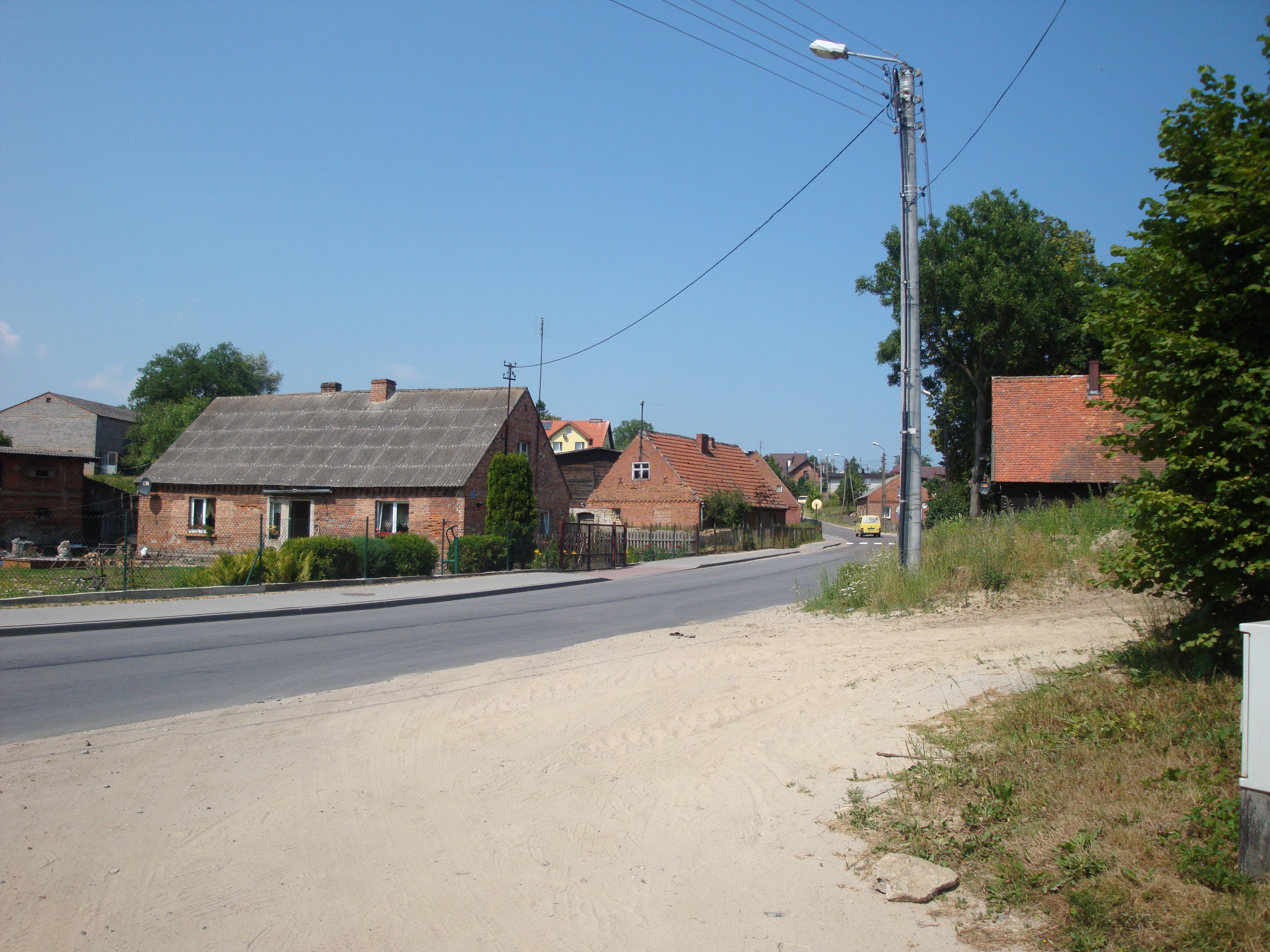

- Location within Poland
- Coordinates: 54°40′6″N 18°24′35″E
- Country: Poland
- Voivodeship: Pomeranian
- County: Puck
- Gmina: Puck
- Population: 796

Smolno ([ˈsmɔlnɔ]; German: Schmolln) is a village in the administrative district of Gmina Puck, within Puck County, Pomeranian Voivodeship, in northern Poland.

For details of the history of the region, see History of Pomerania.
