= Czarna Góra, Puck County =

Czarna Góra
- Settlement
- Location within Poland
- Coordinates: 54°41′12″N 18°13′26″E
- Country: Poland
- Voivodeship: Pomeranian
- County: Puck
- Gmina: Puck

Czarna Góra [ˈt͡ʂarna ˈɡura] is a settlement in the administrative district of Gmina Puck, within Puck County, Pomeranian Voivodeship, in northern Poland.

== See also ==
- History of Pomerania
