= Sławutówko =

- Village
- Location within Poland
- Coordinates: 54°39′45″N 18°21′45″E
- Country: Poland
- Voivodeship: Pomeranian
- County: Puck
- Gmina: Puck
- Population: 180

Sławutówko ([swavuˈtufkɔ]; German: Klein Schlatau, 1942–45 Kleinschlatau) is a village in the administrative district of Gmina Puck, within Puck County, Pomeranian Voivodeship, in northern Poland.

For details of the history of the region, see History of Pomerania.
