= Zele, Poland =

Zele
- Village
- Location within Poland
- Coordinates: 54°45′21″N 18°20′25″E
- Country: Poland
- Voivodeship: Pomeranian
- County: Puck
- Gmina: Puck

Zele [ˈzɛlɛ] is a village in the administrative district of Gmina Puck, within Puck County, Pomeranian Voivodeship, in northern Poland.

For details of the history of the region, see History of Pomerania.
