= Strellin =

Strellin may refer to:

- Strellin, part of the German municipality of Groß Kiesow
- German name of Strzelno, Pomeranian Voivodeship
