= Czarny Młyn, Puck County =

Czarny Młyn
- Settlement
- Location within Poland
- Coordinates: 54°48′30″N 18°17′57″E
- Country: Poland
- Voivodeship: Pomeranian
- County: Puck
- Gmina: Puck
- Population: 85
- Time zone: UTC+1 (CET)
  - Summer (DST): UTC+2 (CEST)
- Vehicle registration: GPU

Czarny Młyn ([ˈt͡ʂarnɨ ˈmwɨn]; German: Czarnauermühle) is a settlement in the administrative district of Gmina Puck, within Puck County, Pomeranian Voivodeship, in northern Poland. It is located within the ethnocultural region of Kashubia in the historic region of Pomerania.

Czarny Młyn was a royal village of the Polish Crown, administratively located in the Puck County in the Pomeranian Voivodeship.
