= Mechowo, Pomeranian Voivodeship =

Mechowo
- Village
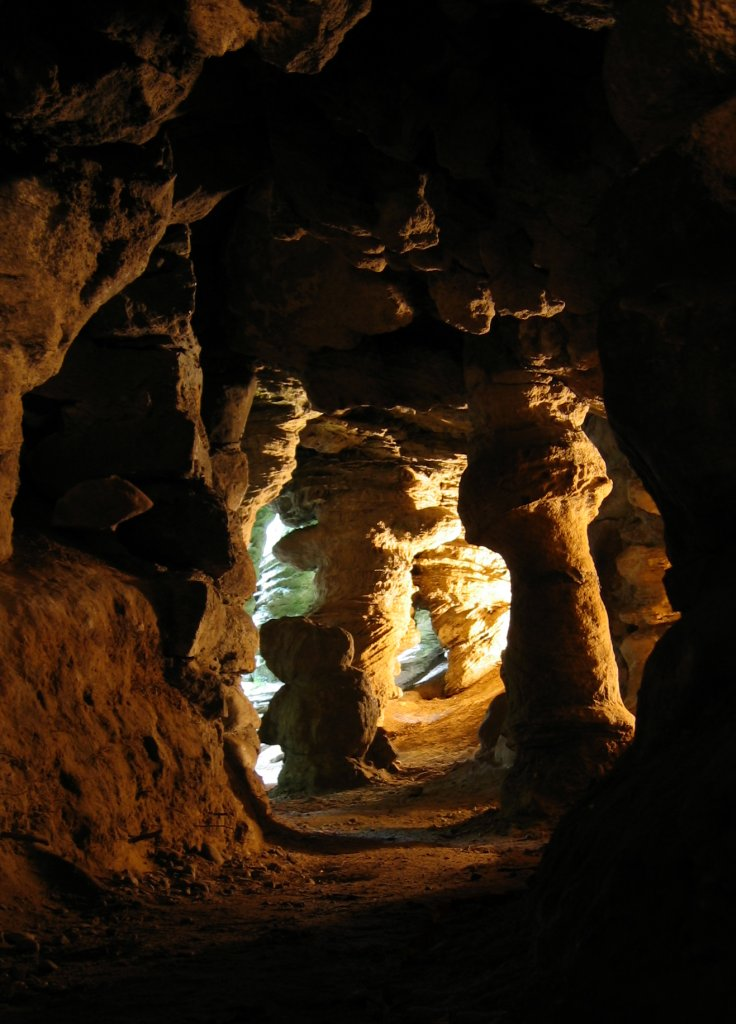
- Caves in Mechowo

- Location within Poland
- Coordinates: 54°42′48″N 18°16′46″E
- Country: Poland
- Voivodeship: Pomeranian
- County: Puck
- Gmina: Puck

Population
  - Total: 409

Mechowo ([mɛˈxɔvɔ]; German: Mechau) is a village in the administrative district of Gmina Puck, within Puck County, Pomeranian Voivodeship, in northern Poland.

Mechowo is on the border of the Darżlubie forest. Points of interest include caves, a church built in 1742, 19th-century houses and an 18th-century manor.
