= Czechy, Pomeranian Voivodeship =

Czechy
- Settlement
- Location within Poland
- Coordinates: 54°43′16″N 18°11′54″E
- Country: Poland
- Voivodeship: Pomeranian
- County: Puck
- Gmina: Puck

Czechy [ˈt͡ʂɛxɨ] is a settlement in the administrative district of Gmina Puck, within Puck County, Pomeranian Voivodeship, in northern Poland.

== See also ==
- History of Pomerania
