= Dana, Pomeranian Voivodeship =

Dana
- Village
- Location within Poland
- Coordinates: 54°46′16″N 18°22′30″E
- Country: Poland
- Voivodeship: Pomeranian
- County: Puck
- Gmina: Puck

Dana [ˈdana] (Kashubian: Danóf) is a village in the administrative district of Gmina Puck, within Puck County, Pomeranian Voivodeship, in northern Poland.
