= Rzucewo =

- Village
- Location within Poland
- Coordinates: 54°41′9″N 18°27′44″E
- Country: Poland
- Voivodeship: Pomeranian
- County: Puck
- Gmina: Puck
- Population: 354

Rzucewo ([ʐuˈt͡sɛvɔ]; German: Rutzau) is a village in the administrative district of Gmina Puck, within Puck County, Pomeranian Voivodeship, in northern Poland. There is also the Rzucewo Castle, which was the residence of the former king of Poland.

== See also ==
- History of Pomerania
