= Błądzikowo =

- Village
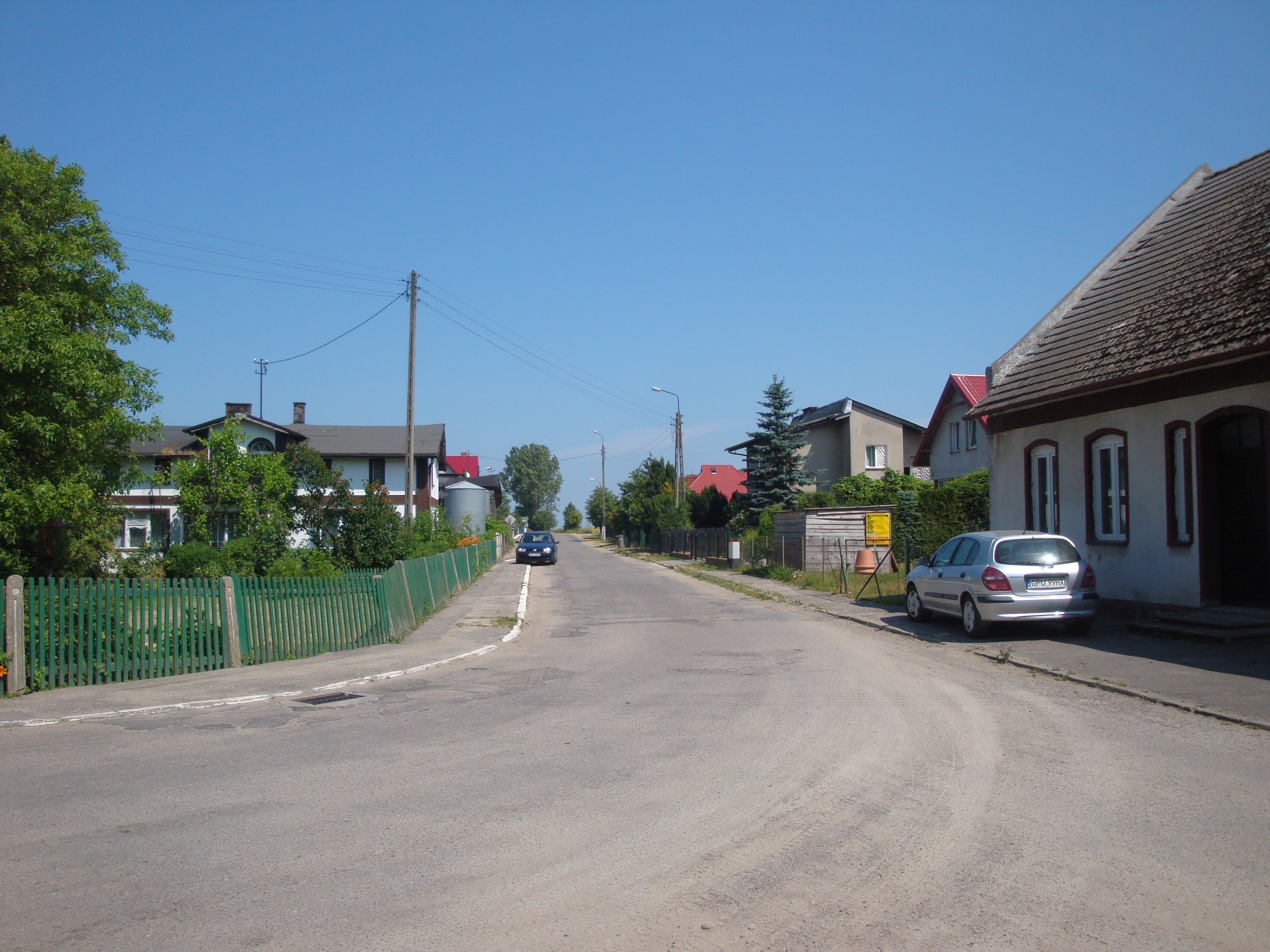

- Location within Poland
- Coordinates: 54°41′52″N 18°25′54″E
- Country: Poland
- Voivodeship: Pomeranian
- County: Puck
- Gmina: Puck
- Population: 188

Błądzikowo (Polish pronunciation: [bwɔɲd͡ʑiˈkɔvɔ]; German: Blondszikau, 1874–1939 Blansekow, 1939–1945 Blansekau) is a village in the administrative district of Gmina Puck, within Puck County, Pomeranian Voivodeship, in northern Poland.

== See also ==
- History of Pomerania
