= Głuszewo =

- Settlement
- Location within Poland
- Coordinates: 54°44′56″N 18°14′28″E
- Country: Poland
- Voivodeship: Pomeranian
- County: Puck
- Gmina: Puck

Głuszewo [ɡwuˈʂɛvɔ] is a settlement in the administrative district of Gmina Puck, within Puck County, Pomeranian Voivodeship, in northern Poland.

== See also ==
- History of Pomerania
