= Mała Piaśnica =

- Village
- Location within Poland
- Coordinates: 54°40′27″N 18°13′32″E
- Country: Poland
- Voivodeship: Pomeranian
- County: Puck
- Gmina: Puck
- Population: 83

Mała Piaśnica ([ˈmawa pjaɕˈnit͡sa]; German: Klein Piasnitz, 1942–45 Kleinpesnitz) is a village in the administrative district of Gmina Puck, within Puck County, Pomeranian Voivodeship, in northern Poland.

== See also ==
- History of Pomerania
