= Rekowo Górne =

- Village
- Location within Poland
- Coordinates: 54°38′30″N 18°20′23″E
- Country: Poland
- Voivodeship: Pomeranian
- County: Puck
- Gmina: Puck
- Population: 1,036
- Website: http://rekowogorne.abc.pl/

Rekowo Górne ([rɛˈkɔvɔ ˈɡurnɛ]; German: Rekau) is a village in the administrative district of Gmina Puck, within Puck County, Pomeranian Voivodeship, in northern Poland.

== See also ==
- History of Pomerania
