= Muza, Pomeranian Voivodeship =

Muza
- Village
- Location within Poland
- Coordinates: 54°39′45″N 18°15′5″E
- Country: Poland
- Voivodeship: Pomeranian
- County: Puck
- Gmina: Puck

Muza ([ˈmuza]; German: Musa, 1942–45 Mittenwalde) is a village in the administrative district of Gmina Puck, within Puck County, Pomeranian Voivodeship, in northern Poland. Gdańsk.

== See also ==
- History of Pomerania
