= Łyśniewo =

- Village
- Location within Poland
- Coordinates: 54°47′49″N 18°19′47″E
- Country: Poland
- Voivodeship: Pomeranian
- County: Puck
- Gmina: Puck
- Population: 45

Łyśniewo ([wɨɕˈɲɛvɔ]; Kashubian: Łësniewò; German: Lißnau, 1942–45 Lissen) is a village in the administrative district of Gmina Puck, within Puck County, Pomeranian Voivodeship, in northern Poland.

== See also ==
- History of Pomerania
