= Zemia Rodnô =

Kashubian patriotic song

Zemia Rodnô (Kashubian pronunciation: [zɛmja rɔdˈnɞ], lit. Native Land) is a Kashubian patriotic song commonly regarded as the national anthem of Kashubia and its people. Its author is Jan Trepczyk, a prominent Kashubian activist, who wrote the song in 1954. The first symphonic performance was performed in 2006 by the Kashubian-Pomeranian Association.

== Text ==
Text and translations
Kashubian text	Polish translation	English translation
Zemia Rodnô, pëszny kaszëbsczi kraju, Òd Gduńska tu, jaż do Roztoczi bróm! Të jes snôżô, jak kwiat rozkwitłi w maju. Ce, Tatczëznã, jô lubòtną tu móm. Sambòrów miecz i Swiãtopôłka biôtczi W spòsobie Ce dlô nas ùchòwałë. Twòje jô w przódk bëlné pòcyskóm kwiôtczi. Òdrodë cél Kaszëbóm znôw brënie. Tu jô dali mdã starżã zemi trzimôł, Skądka zôczątk rodnô naj rózga mô. Tu mdã dali domôcëznë sã jimôł Jaż zajasni i nama brzôd swój dô.	Ziemio Ojczysta, piękny kaszubski kraju, Od Gdańska tu, aż do Roztoki bram! Tyś jest piękna jak kwiat rozkwitły w maju. Cię, kochaną Ojczyznę tutaj mam. Sambora miecz i Świętopełka bitwy Chroniły i zachowały dla nas Cię. Do przodu więc Twe piękne rzucam kwiatki. Idea odrodzenia Kaszubom znów dojrzewa. Tutaj dalej straż nad ziemią będę trzymał, Gdzie naszych korzeni początek jest. Tutaj dalej będę naszą kulturę wzbogacał Aż rozbłyśnie i owoc swój nam da.	Native land, glorious Kashubian country, Here, from Gduńsk to Roztoka’s gates! Pretty Thee, like flower bloomed in May, You, beloved home here I have. Sambòr’s sword and Swiãtopôłk’s frays Kept You safe for future generations. Forward I throw Thy beautiful flowers. Rebirth idea for Kashubs glows again. Here I’ll watch over the land, Where our nation’s roots begin. Here, I’ll dedicate myself Until it blooms and gives us its fruit.

== Use ==
Zemia Rodnô is the official anthem (or official song) of the following groups:

- Pomorania Students' Club
- Kashubian Choir Council
- Kaszëbskô Jednota

Since 19 March 2012, Radio Kaszëbë plays the anthem at noon and midnight.

A ceremonial version of the anthem plays during Kashubian Unity Day.
