= Kashubian Association =

Kashubian association founded in 2011

Kashubian Association Kaszëbskô Jednota (Kashubian) Wspólnota Kaszubska (Polish)
- Chairman: Karol Rhode
- Founded: August 12, 2011
- Headquarters: ul. Wejherowska 58A, 84-240 Reda
- Ideology: Regionalism; Kashubian autonomy Kashubian minority interests
- Political position: Centre-left

Party flag

Website
- www.kaszebsko.com

The Kashubian Association (Kashubian: Kaszëbskô Jednota; Polish: Wspólnota Kaszubska) is a Poland-based association for Kashubians with the aim of developing the national, civic and cultural awareness of Kashubians from around the world. In particular, it is calling for recognizing the Kashubian as an ethnic minority in Poland: in the current Polish law on minorities, the only right the Kashubians enjoy is the status of their language as regional.

== History of organisation ==
The Kashubian Association was founded on August 12, 2011, by people previously associated with the magazines Tatczëzna and Òdroda (Kaszëbskô Òdroda), the Nasze Kaszuby internet portal (formerly 'Kashubian-Pomeranian Resources'), the literary group ZYMK (Zéńdzenié Młodëch Ùtwórców Kaszëbsczich; Polish: Spotkanie Młodych Autorów Kaszubskich: English: Conference of Young Kashubian Authors) and the Kashubian-Pomeranian Association.

The Kashubian Association is an active organisation operating mainly in the Pomeranian Voivodeship. The party's activities are largely based on promoting the idea of the Kashubian nation, education about regional history, supporting local culture and speaking on behalf of Kashubians in larger state structures. KJ has been advocating for the recognition of Kashubians as an ethnic minority since 2012, but in Poland they officially remain a community using regional language. In 2012, a member of the Common Commission of the Government and National and Ethnic Minorities, Artur Jablonski, vice-president of KJ, was dismissed following controversy over his activities in the Kashubian Association. This sparked a large protest among supporters of the ideas represented by the association.

KA members regularly speak out about the status and situation of Kashubians in Poland, as well as the attitude and mentality of Kashubians themselves, mainly in the media. Many articles ideologically compatible with and supporting the aims of KJ are published by the magazine "Skra" ("Skra - pismiono ò kùlturze") - articles on Kashubian history and culture, material in Kashubian language, columns, and news from the region are posted there.

The association actively promotes Kashubian symbols. In 2012. The Kashubian Association prompted the municipal authorities of Wejherowo to change the hymn 'Kashubian March, played since 2002. (unrecognised by some Kashubians and unsupported by the KJ) to Zemia Rodnô. It has been proposed that the Kashubian Flag Day be celebrated on 18 August from this year onwards. The day has since been celebrated as Kashubian Flag Day.

In 2012, KJ chairman Mateusz Meyer created a script to translate Facebook and Google|Google into Kashubian.

In 2013, the Kashubian Association, in reaction to Bronisław Komorowski's arrival at Saturday's Kashubian Convention, members of the association issued an open letter asking for support for their idea of an ethnic minority.

In 2015, the association promoted the Facebook profile "I am a Kashubian, I am a Silesian, not a Pole", again promoting the idea of recognising Kashubs as a national minority.

In 2016, KJ proclaimed 2016 the "year of the Kashubian language in public space".

In 2016, Kaszëbskô Jednota became an observer member of the European Free Alliance.

In 2018, as a result of insufficient applicants to University of Gdańsk, it was decided to abolish the Kashubian ethnophilology major. In front of the Rector's Office of the University of Gdansk, in a protest organised by Kaszëbska Jednotã and Pismiono Skra, more than 50 people demanded that the University of Gdansk authorities reinstate the course. Kashubian Ethnophilology was not reinstated in 2018, but it was introduced again in 2019.

Kaszëbskô Jednota is a partner of the private primary school and kindergarten DEJA CSB, where children are taught, among other things, the Kashubian language.

== Objectives ==
The Statute of the organization declares the following goals:

1. Lobby for a change in the law on minorities, so that Kashubs acquire ethnic minority status.
2. Resurgence and establishment of the national consciousness of Kashubians.
3. Revival of Kashubian culture.
4. Promoting knowledge about Kashubians.
5. Protecting the ethnic rights of people declaring Kashubian nationality.
6. Shaping and developing active attitude among the young generation of Kashubians, fostering the creation of governance and a sense of full responsibility for their homeland.

=== Minority status ===
The association seeks consolidation of the Kashubian national movement and asserts that ethnic minority status is necessary to increase the protection and development of the Kashubian culture. The president of the Kashubian-Pomeranian Association, Łukasz Grzędzicki, disagrees that ethnic minority status is necessary or desirable.

== Members ==
In 2021, the organization had about 150 members. Among them were Los Angeles County Assessor Jeff Prang, whose great-grandfathers immigrated from Kashubia and David Shulist, the head of the Wilno Heritage Society and the author of two Kashubian-English-Polish multilingual dictionaries. Shulist is also a city councilor and former mayor of Madawaska Valley, Canada and led the initiative to make Madawaska Valley and the Lipusz, a Kashubian village in Poland, sister cities.
