= Starzyno, Pomeranian Voivodeship =

Starzyno
- Village
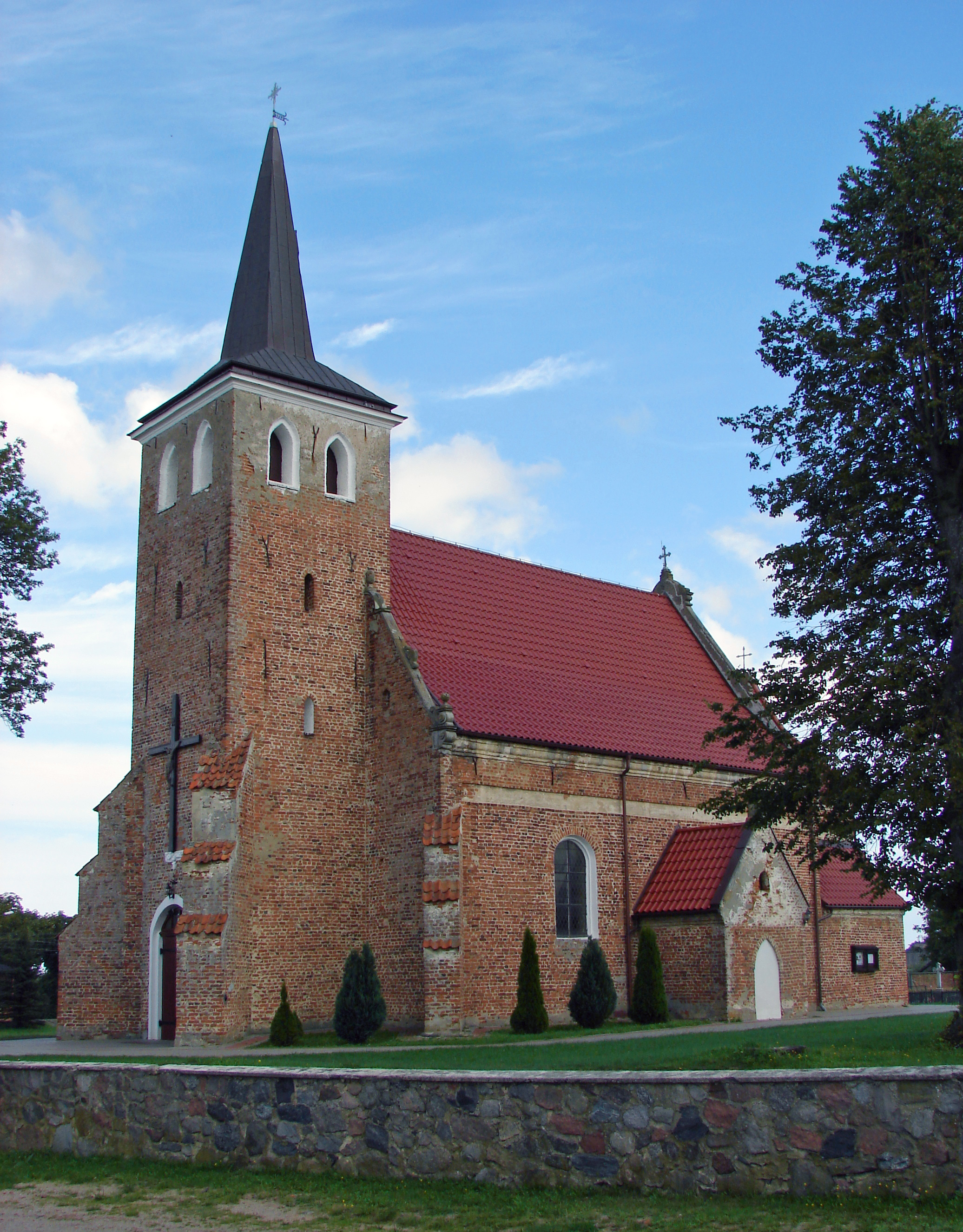
- Saint Archangel Michael Church

- Location within Poland
- Coordinates: 54°45′21″N 18°15′46″E
- Country: Poland
- Voivodeship: Pomeranian
- County: Puck
- Gmina: Puck
- Elevation: 36 m (118 ft)
- Population: 1,226
- Website: http://starzyno.republika.pl

Starzyno ([staˈʐɨnɔ]; Kashubian: Starzno or Starzëno; German: Groß Starsin, 1942–45 Großstarsen) is a village in the administrative district of Gmina Puck, within Puck County, Pomeranian Voivodeship, in northern Poland.

For details of the history of the region, see History of Pomerania.

== Sport ==
Established in 1947, the village is represented by the football club Kaszubia Starzyno, although they have not competed in the league pyramid since withdrawing from Klasa A during the 2020/2021 season.
