= Kaczyniec, Pomeranian Voivodeship =

Kaczyniec
- Settlement
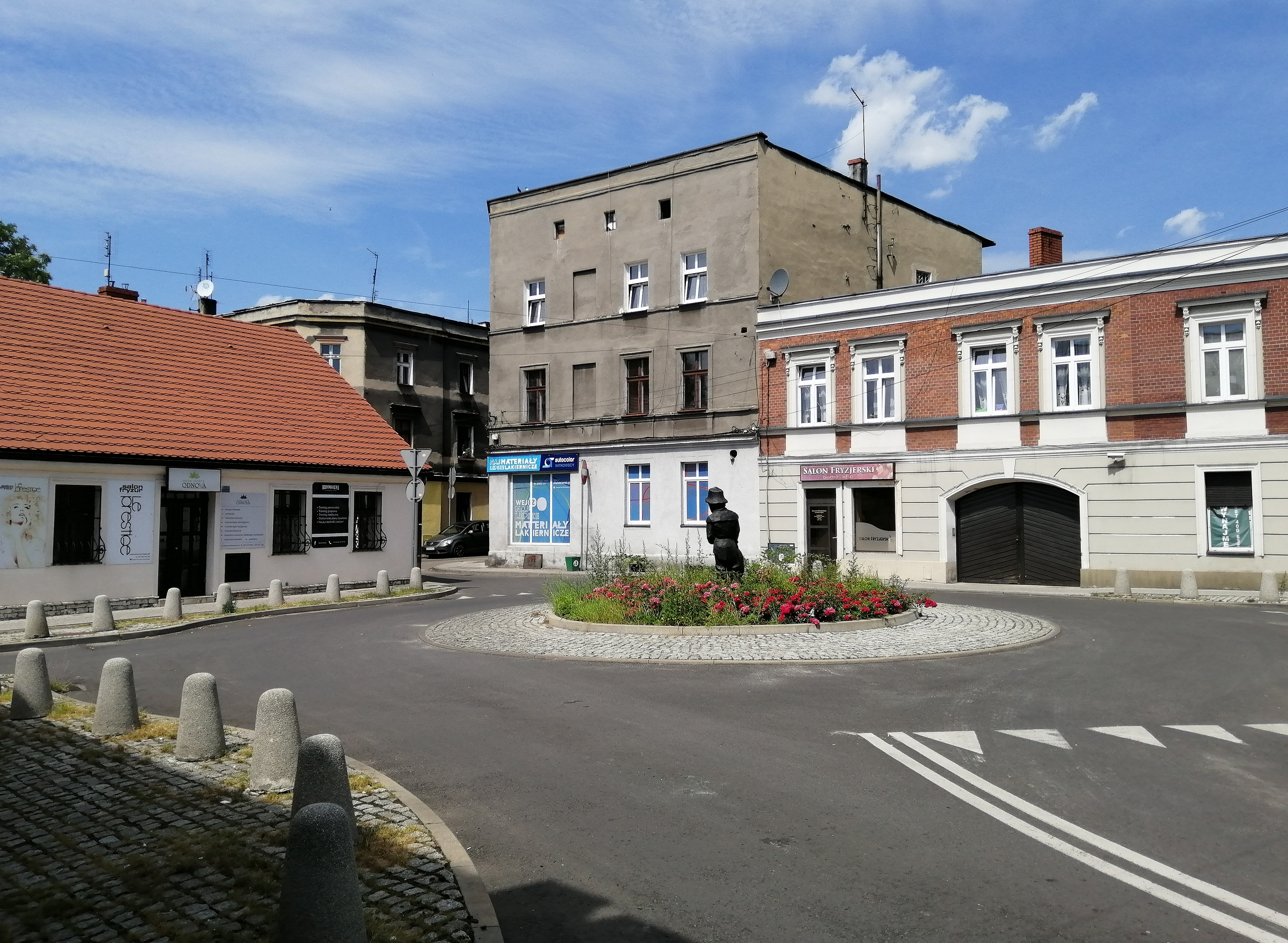

- Location within Poland
- Coordinates: 54°47′48″N 18°17′51″E
- Country: Poland
- Voivodeship: Pomeranian
- County: Puck
- Gmina: Puck
- Population: 76

Kaczyniec [kaˈt͡ʂɨɲɛt͡s] is a settlement in the administrative district of Gmina Puck, within Puck County, Pomeranian Voivodeship, in northern Poland.

== See also ==
- History of Pomerania
