= Mieroszyno-Parcele =

- Village
- Location within Poland
- Coordinates: 54°48′26″N 18°18′41″E
- Country: Poland
- Voivodeship: Pomeranian
- County: Puck
- Gmina: Puck

Mieroszyno-Parcele is a village in the administrative district of Gmina Puck, within Puck County, Pomeranian Voivodeship, in northern Poland.

== See also ==
- History of Pomerania
