= Gmina Puck =

Gmina Puck Puck Commune
- Gmina
- Coat of arms
- Interactive map of Gmina Puck
- Coordinates (Puck): 54°42′N 18°24′E
- Country: Poland
- Voivodeship: Pomeranian
- County: Puck
- Seat: Puck

Area
  - Total: 243.29 km^{2} (93.93 sq mi)

Population (2006)
  - Total: 21,868
  - Density: 89.884/km^{2} (232.80/sq mi)
- Website: http://www.gmina.puck.pl/

Gmina Puck is a rural gmina (administrative district) in Puck County, Pomeranian Voivodeship, in northern Poland. Its seat is the town of Puck, although the town is not part of the territory of the gmina.

The gmina covers an area of 243.29 square kilometres (93.9 sq mi), and as of 2006 its total population is 21,868.

The gmina contains part of the protected area called Coastal Landscape Park.

== Villages ==
Gmina Puck contains the villages and settlements of Beka, Błądzikowo, Brudzewo, Celbówko, Celbowo, Czarna Góra, Czarny Młyn, Czechy, Dana, Darżlubie, Domatówko, Domatowo, Głuszewo, Gnieżdżewo, Kaczyniec, Łebcz, Leśniewo, Łyśniewo, Mała Piaśnica, Mechowo, Mieroszyno, Mieroszyno-Wybudowanie, Moście Błota, Mrzezino, Muza, Osłonino, Podgóry, Połchowo, Połczyno, Pustki, Radoszewo, Rekowo Górne, Rzucewo, Sikorzyno, Sławutówko, Sławutowo, Smolno, Starzyno, Starzyński Dwór, Strzelno, Swarzewo, Werblinia, Widlino, Wielka Piaśnica, Zdrada, Zele and Żelistrzewo.

== Neighbouring gminas ==
Gmina Puck is bordered by the towns of Puck, Reda, Rumia and Władysławowo, and by the gminas of Kosakowo, Krokowa and Wejherowo.
