= Kashubia =

Historical region in Pomerania, Poland

Kashubia: Kaszëbë (Kashubian); Kaszuby (Polish)
- Historical region
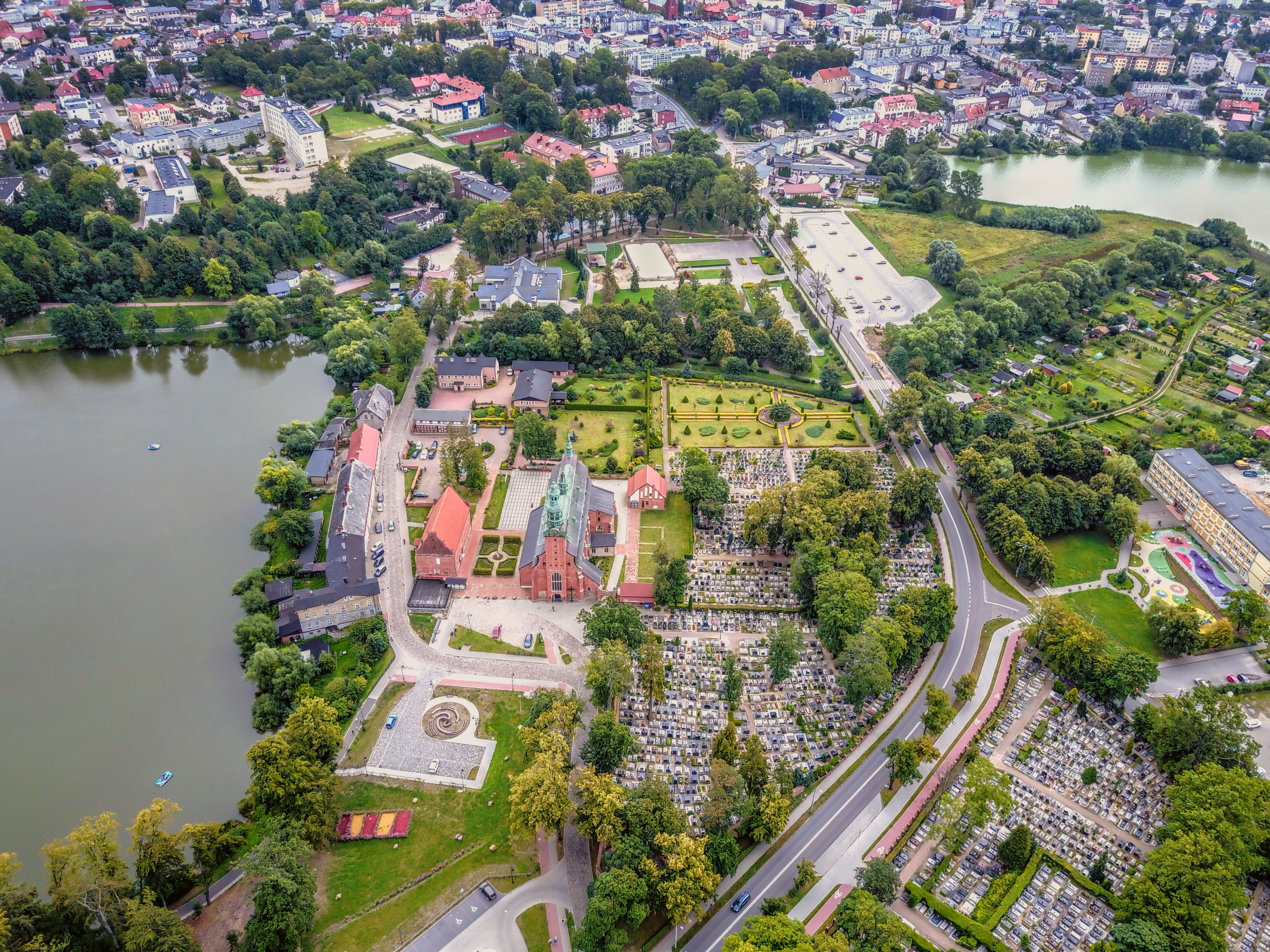
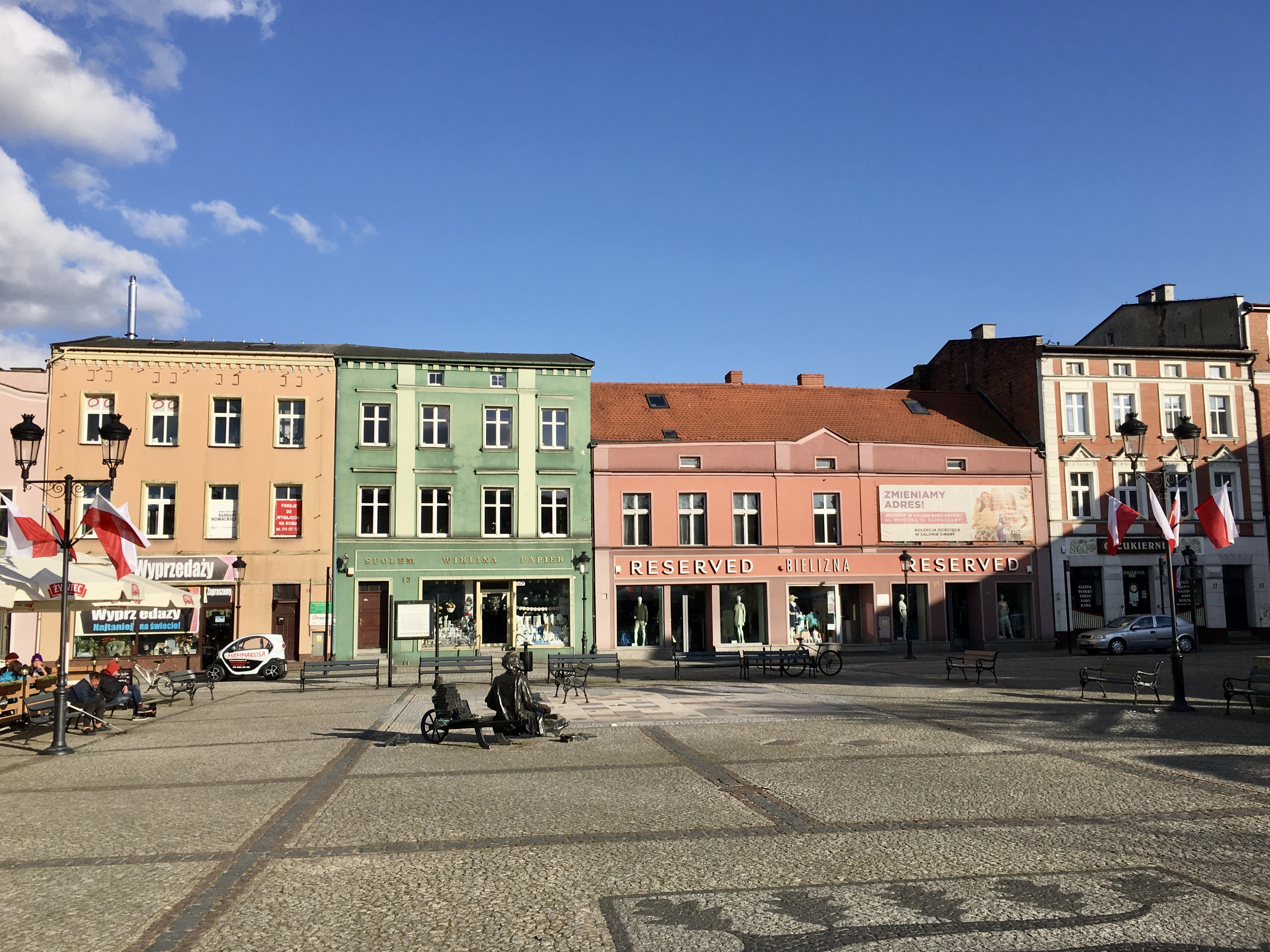
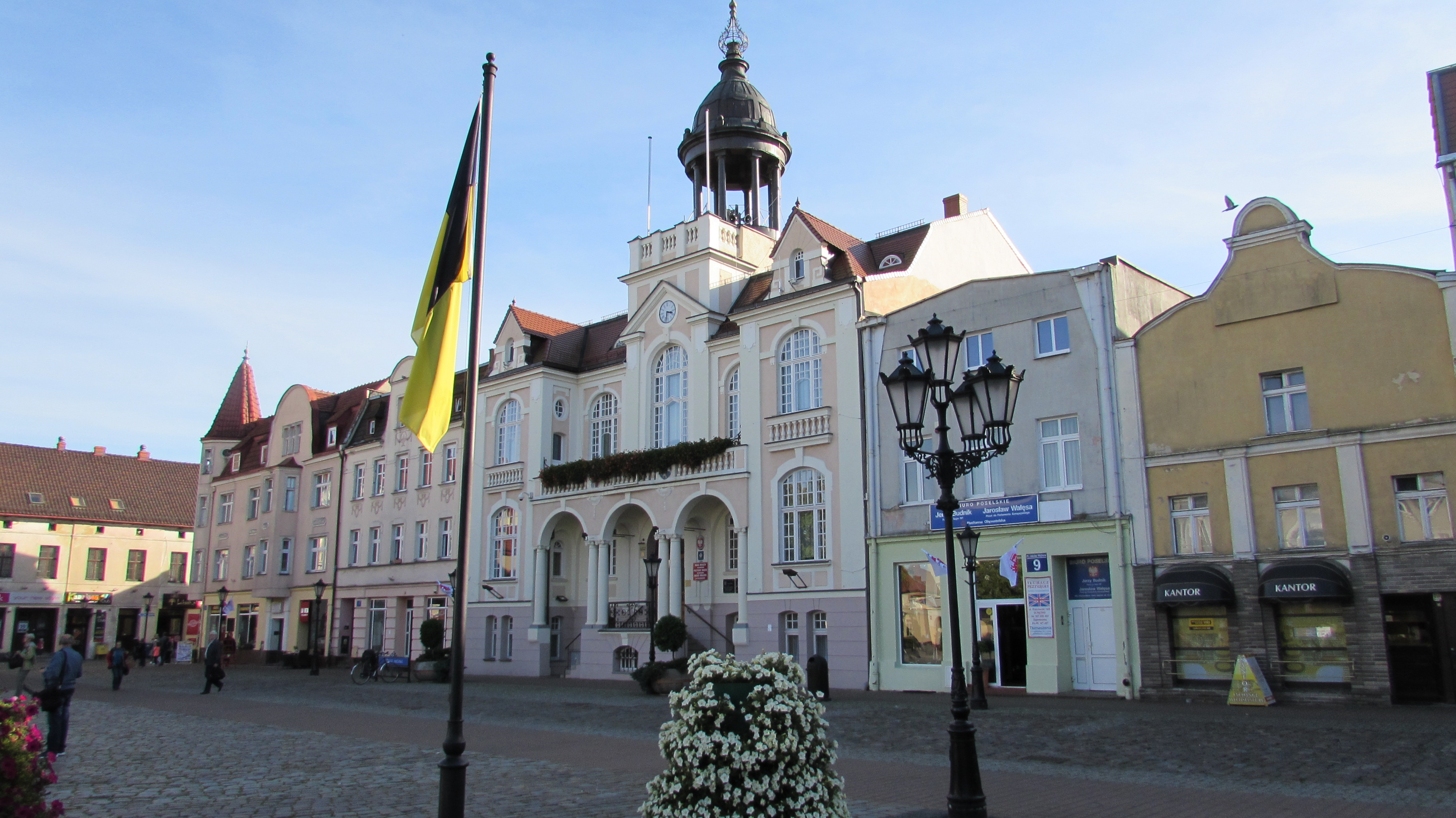
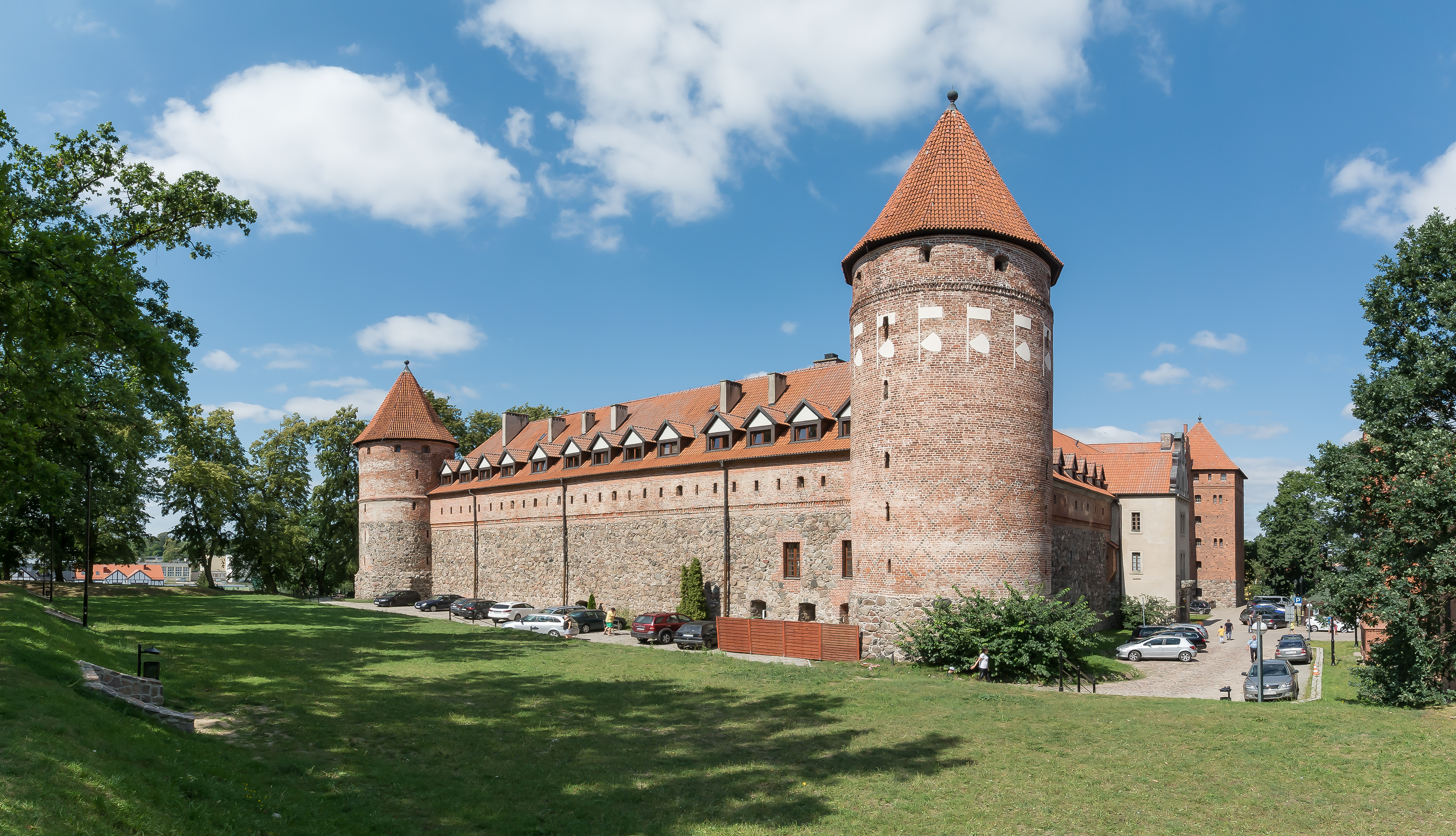
- From top, left to right: Aerial view of Kartuzy; Rynek (Market Square) in Kościerzyna; Rynek (Market Square) in Wejherowo; Bytów Castle

- Flag Coat of arms
- Anthem: Zemia Rodnô
- Kashubians in Kashubia in 2005
- Coordinates: 54.25°N 17.68°E
- Country: Poland
- Voivodeship: Pomeranian Voivodeship
- Largest cities: Gdynia, Sopot, Puck, Kościerzyna, Bytów, Kartuzy, Wejherowo, Gdańsk
- Demonym: Kashubian
- Time zone: UTC+1 (CET)
  - Summer (DST): UTC+2 (CEST)

Kashubia or Cassubia (Kashubian: Kaszëbë or Kaszëbskô; Polish: Kaszuby [kaˈʂubɨ]; German: Kaschubei or Kaschubien) is an ethnocultural region in the historic Eastern Pomerania (Pomerelia) region of northern Poland. It is inhabited by the Kashubian people, and many in the region have historically spoken the Kashubian language, with some still speaking it.

The unofficial self-description of "capital city of Kashubia" has long been contested by Kartuzy and Kościerzyna.

== Location and geography ==
Physical map of Kashubia in the year 1910

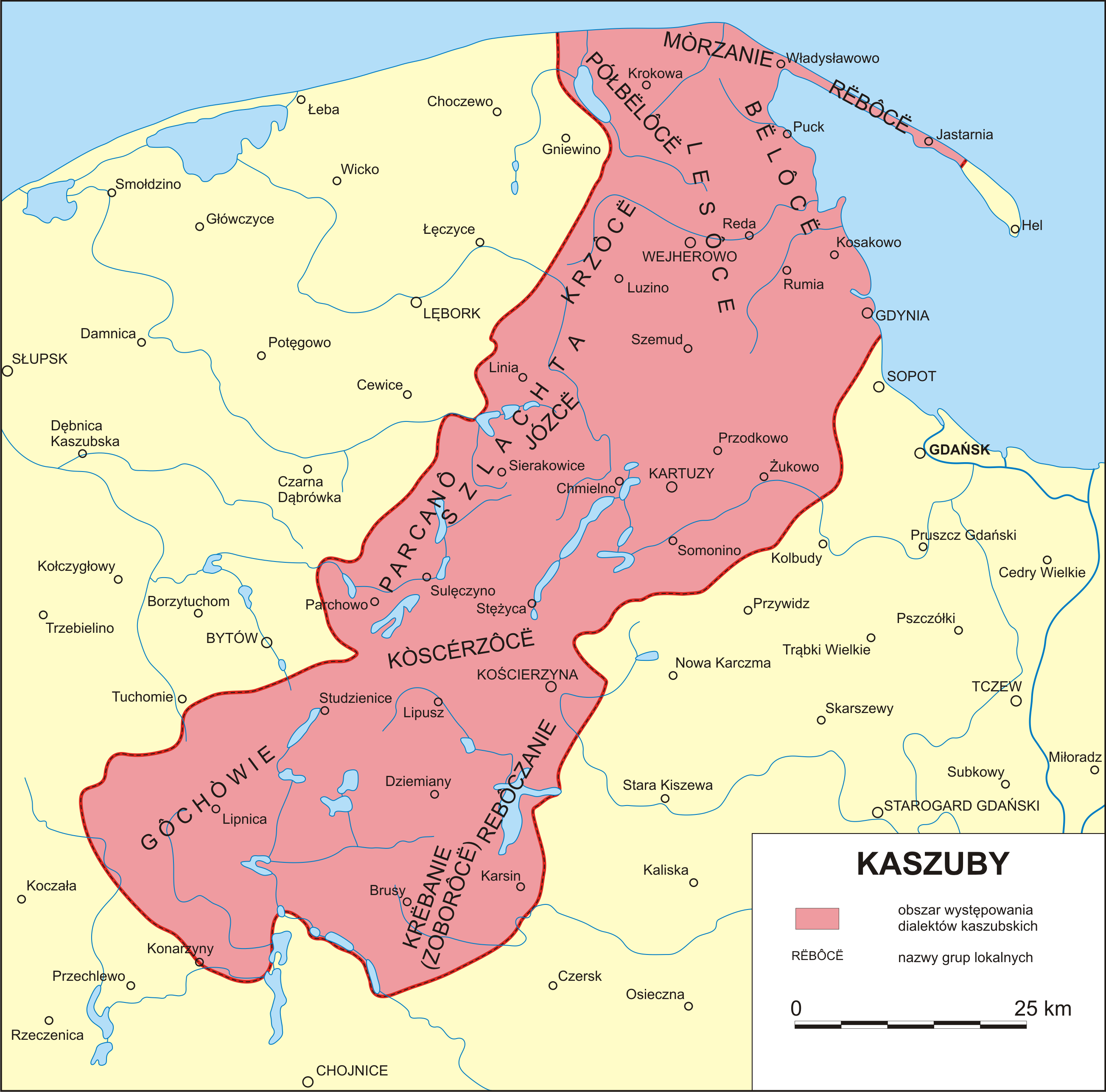
Kashubia by Bernard Sychta as the Kashubian dialects area

Located west of Gdańsk (inclusive of all but the easternmost district) and the mouth of the Vistula river, it is inhabited by members of the Kashubian ethnic group. The region is home to the Kashubian Lake District. According to the 1999 basic study Geografia współczesnych Kaszub (Geography of present-day Kashubia) by the Gdańsk scholar Jan Mordawski 43 municipalities (gminas) of the Pomeranian Voivodeship have a Kashubian share of at least one third of the total population:

- Cities: Gdynia (Gdiniô)
- Bytów County (Bëtowsczi kréz): Town of Bytów (Bëtowò) with Gmina Bytów, Gmina Czarna Dąbrówka (Czôrnô Dãbrówka), Gmina Lipnica (Lëpnica), Gmina Parchowo (Parchòwò), Gmina Tuchomie (Tëchòmié)
- Chojnice County (Chònicczi kréz): Town of Brusy (Brusë) with Gmina Brusy, Gmina Chojnice (Chojnice), Gmina Konarzyny (Kònarzënë)
- Człuchów County (Człëchòwsczi kréz): Gmina Przechlewo (Przechlewò)
- Lębork County (Lãbòrsczi kréz): Gmina Cewice (Céwice)
- Kartuzy County (Kartësczi kréz): Town of Kartuzy (Kartuzë) with Gmina Kartuzy, Town of Żukowo (Żukòwò) with Gmina Żukowo, Gmina Chmielno (Chmielno), Gmina Przodkowo (Przedkòwò), Gmina Sulęczyno (Sëlëczëno), Gmina Sierakowice (Sërakòjce), Gmina Somonino (Somònino), Gmina Stężyca (Stãżëca)
- Kościerzyna County (Kòscérsczi kréz): Town of Kościerzyna (Kòscérzëna) with Gmina Kościerzyna, Gmina Dziemiany (Dzemiónë), Gmina Karsin (Kôrsëno), Gmina Lipusz (Lëpùsz), Gmina Nowa Karczma (Nowô Karczma)
- Puck County (Pùcczi kréz): Town of Puck (Pùck) with Gmina Puck, towns of Hel (Hél), Jastarnia (Jastarniô) and Władysławowo (Wiôlgô Wies), Gmina Kosakowo (Kòsôkòwò), Gmina Krokowa (Krokòwa)
- Wejherowo County (Wejrowsczi kréz): Town of Wejherowo (Wejrowò) and Gmina Wejherowo, towns of Reda (Réda) and Rumia (Rëmiô), Gmina Choczewo (Chòczewò), Gmina Gniewino (Gniewino), Gmina Linia (Lëniô), Gmina Luzino (Lëzëno), Gmina Łęczyce (Łãczëce), Gmina Szemud (Szëmôłd)

== Culture ==
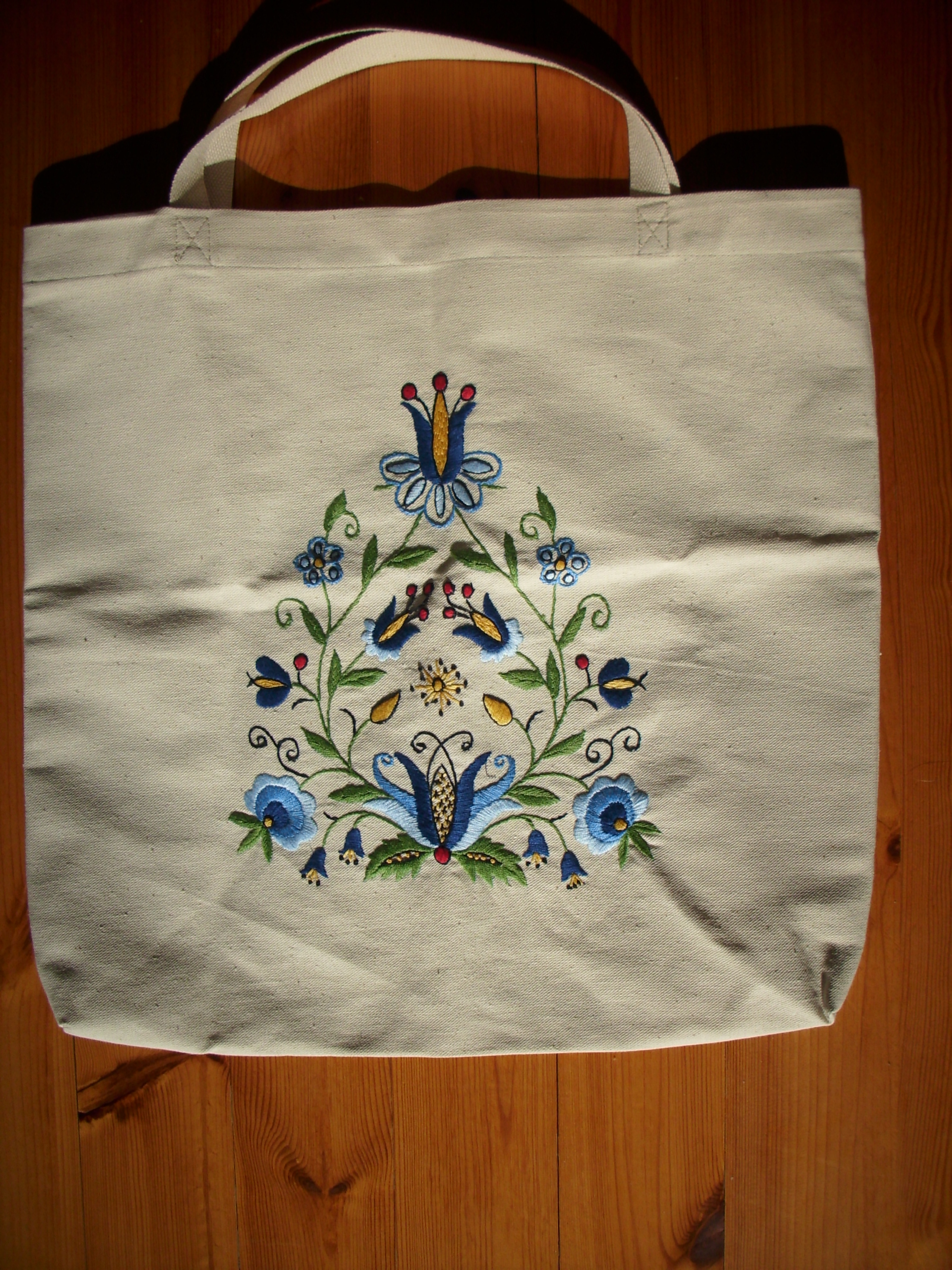
Kashubian embroidery from Żukowo

=== Kashubian emblem and flag ===
Although there are no legal regulations regarding the use of Kashubian symbols, the griffin, i.e. a mythical animal, derived from antiquity, is considered the emblem and symbol of the Kashubians. The Kashubian griffin is in black on a yellow background (optionally golden). The colors of the Kashubian flag are taken from the emblem - the upper color is black, and the lower one is yellow (golden). A Kashubian flag with a griffin in the center is also used. If there is an emblem on the flag, then the background is yellow.

=== Embroidery ===
Embroidery is an important part of Kashubian culture which uses seven colours: three shades of blue representing the sky, the lakes and Baltic Sea, green representing the meadows and forests, yellow representing the sun, red representing the peoples' love for the region, and the black representing the hard work of the Kashubians. Its origins date back to the early 13th century.

=== Cuisine ===
Kashubian cuisine is mostly based on fish and meat. Grain is also widely used within Kashubian dishes. Herring are the most widely used fish due to their high numbers in the region. Mushrooms are also a part of Kashubia's wide variety of dishes.

=== Music ===
Kashubia has a wide variety of music; Zemia Rodnô is widely considered to be the anthem of Kashubia. The most recognised Kashubian song is Kaszëbsczé nótë, a traditional song that is the most recognisable part of Kashubian folklore. Dances are also a noticeable part of Kashubian culture, which are moderately energetic, except for a few. The most famous dance is the Kòséder.

=== Language ===
Linguistic map of Kashubia and neighboring regions in the year 1910

The Kashubian language is a West Slavic language belonging to the Lechitic subgroup. It was historically considered a dialect of Polish, but is now officially recognized as a regional language and enjoys legal protection as such. In a 2011 census, over 108,000 people in Poland declared that they mainly use Kashubian at home.

=== Religion ===
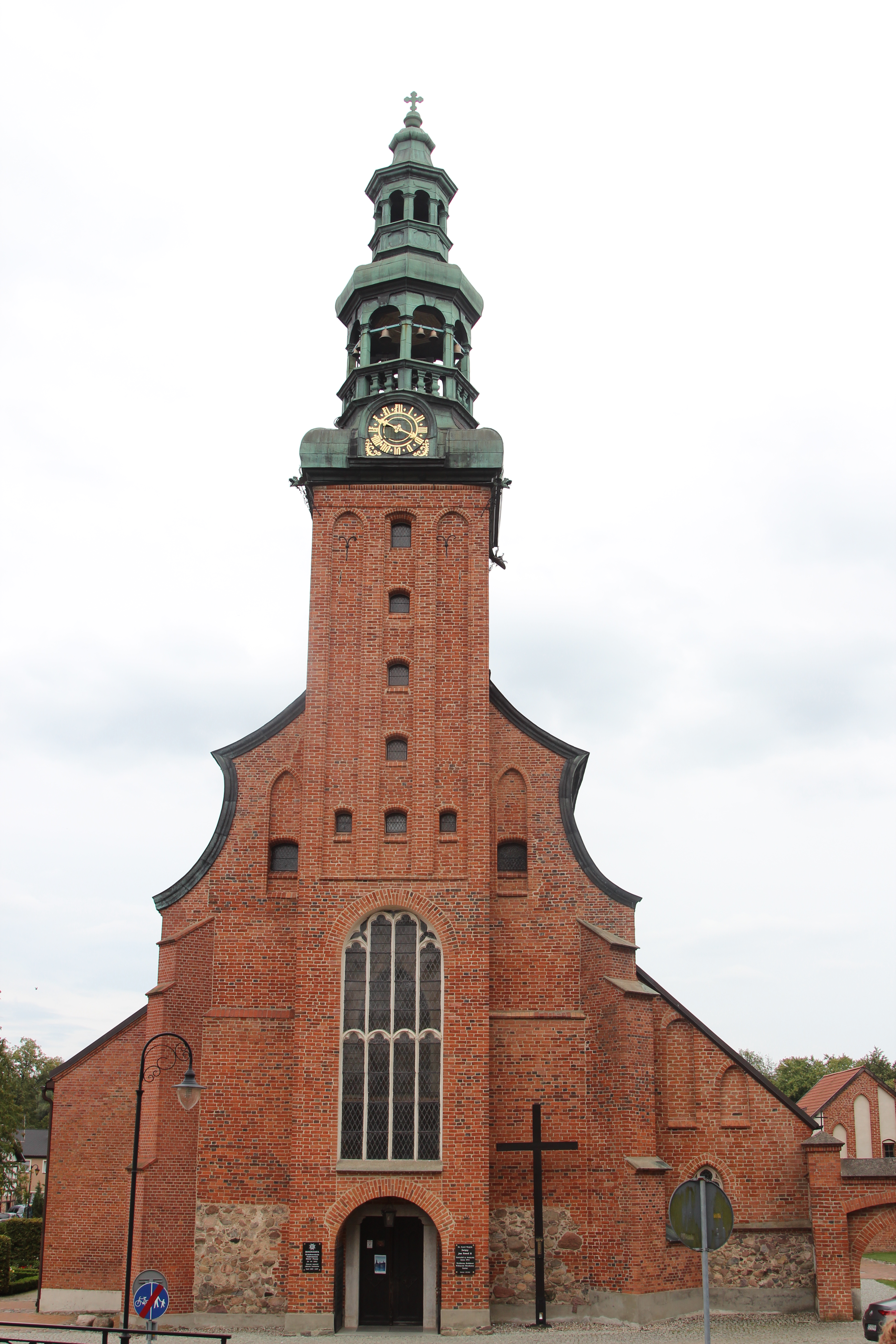
Church of the Assumption in Kartuzy

The population of the region, like the majority of Poland, is predominantly Catholic. Important regional Catholic sites include the Wejherowo Calvary in Wejherowo, and the Church of the Assumption within the former Carthusian monastery in Kartuzy.

=== Sports ===
The ethnolinguistic identity of Kashubia is often reflected in the names of the region's sports associations such as Cassubian Bolszewo, Kaszubia Kościerzyna, Kaszuby Połchowo, Kaszubia Starzyno, Kaszubia Studzienice, and the football team Nörda Karwia which incorporates the Kashubian language into its club name.

Supporters of the football club Arka Gdynia regularly express their Kashubian identity with the chant "Arka Gdynia Kaszëbë!" In 2010, during the Tricity Derby at the MOSiR stadium, ultras of Arka Gdynia unveiled a new banner displaying the moniker Kaszëbë, which was to become one of the fans most recognisable banners. The club has since capitalised on the Kashubian identity of its fanbase. On the occasion of Kashubian Unity Day in 2023 the team played in the colours of the Kashubian flag with a kit incorporating the Kashubian language and patterns inspired by traditional Kashubian embroidery.
