= Puck County =

Puck County Powiat pucki
- County
- Flag Coat of arms

- Division into gminas
- Coordinates (Puck): 54°42′N 18°24′E
- Country: Poland
- Voivodeship: Pomeranian
- Seat: Puck
- Gminas: Total 7 (incl. 4 urban): Hel; Jastarnia; Puck; Gmina Władysławowo; Gmina Kosakowo; Gmina Krokowa; Gmina Puck

Area
  - Total: 577.85 km^{2} (223.11 sq mi)

Population (2019)
  - Total: 85,211
  - Density: 147.46/km^{2} (381.93/sq mi)
  - Urban: 27,114
  - Rural: 58,097
- Car plates: GPU
- Website: powiat.puck.pl

Puck County (Polish: powiat pucki, Kashubian: pùcczi pòwiat) is a unit of territorial administration and local government (powiat) in Pomeranian Voivodeship, northern Poland, on the Baltic coast. The powiat of this name existed in the history of Poland, since the times of the Polish–Lithuanian Commonwealth up to 1795, and then reintroduced in 1999.

== Modern Puck County ==
The modern Puck County came into being on January 1, 1999, as a result of the Polish local government reforms passed in 1998. Its administrative seat is the town of Puck, which lies 40 kilometres (25 mi) north of the regional capital Gdańsk. The county contains three other towns: Władysławowo, 16 km (10 mi) north of Puck, Jastarnia, 18 km (11 mi) east of Puck, and Hel, 29 km (18 mi) east of Puck, at the tip of the Hel Peninsula.

The county covers an area of 577.85 square kilometres (223.1 sq mi). As of 2019 its total population is 85,211, out of which the population of Puck is 11,213, that of Władysławowo is 9,930, that of Hel is 3,267, that of Jastarnia is 2,704, and the rural population is 58,097.

Puck County on a map of the counties of Pomeranian Voivodeship

Puck County is bordered by the city of Gdynia to the south and Wejherowo County to the south-west. It also borders the Bay of Puck to the east and the Baltic Sea to the north.

=== Administrative divisions ===
The county is subdivided into seven gminas (three urban, one urban-rural and three rural). These are listed in the following table, in descending order of population.

Gmina	Type	Area (km^{2})	Population (2019)	Seat
Gmina Puck	rural	243.3	26,522	Puck *
Gmina Władysławowo	urban-rural	38.4	15,405	Władysławowo
Gmina Kosakowo	rural	47.4	15,268	Kosakowo
Puck	urban	4.9	11,213	
Gmina Krokowa	rural	211.8	10,832	Krokowa
Hel	urban	21.3	3,267	
Gmina Jastarnia	urban-rural	8.0	2,704	Jastarnia
* seat not part of the gmina

== Transport ==
=== Railway transport ===
The railway network in the area of this county consists of two active railway lines, 213 and dismantled 263. The lines intersected in Swarzewo.

The station in Puck was located closest to the sea on the Polish railway network, which is why a temporary harbor with a railway siding was built in Puck. The development of railways in the county in the 1920s caused the development of tourism on Hel Spit. Because of the largely tourist traffic on Hel Spit, line 213 shows high seasonal variability of transports. Freight traffic, due to the lack of industry, is marginal.
