= Śliwiński =

Śliwiński (feminine: Śliwińska; plural: Śliwińscy) is a Polish surname. It comes from toponyms derived from the noun śliwa ("plum"). It may refer to:

- Andrzej Śliwiński (1939–2009), Polish Catholic bishop
- Arsen Śliwiński (born 1996), Polish sprint canoeist
- Artur Śliwiński (1877–1953), Prime Minister of Poland
- Edyta Śliwińska (born 1981), Polish ballroom dancer
- Jeanette Sliwinski (born 1982), American model
- Józef Śliwiński (1865–1930), Polish classical pianist
- Michał Śliwiński (born 1970), Ukrainian-Polish sprint canoeist
- Renata Śliwińska (born 1996), Polish Paralympic athlete
