= Bruno Kant =

German priest (1916–2026)

The Very Reverend Bruno Kant
- Born: 26 February 1916; West Prussia, German Empire
- Died: 29 May 2026 (aged 110); Germany
- Occupation: Catholic priest
- Known for: World's oldest Catholic priest

Bruno Kant (26 February 1916 – 29 May 2026) was a German Roman Catholic priest and supercentenarian.

== Biography ==
Kant was born on 26 February 1916 in Werblin, West Prussia, in the German Empire during World War I. When his education was finished, he studied philosophy and theology in Braunsberg and in Freiburg im Breisgau. In 1943 he was drafted into the Wehrmacht. He served on the Eastern Front and was eventually taken prisoner of war by the Soviets, from which he was released in 1948.

He then resumed his theological studies and was ordained a priest in 1950 in Fulda Cathedral by Bishop Johann Baptist Dietz. He worked as a pastor in the Diocese of Fulda until his retirement in 1991, and from 1960 in Marbach. From 1981 to 1986 Kant was dean of the deanery of Hünfeld.

From 1991 he lived as a retiree in Eichenzell-Löschenrod in East Hesse, where the square in front of the Church of the Resurrection bears his name. There he still celebrated mass as a celebrant at the age of 100. In addition, a street in the Petersberg district of Marbach is named after him. At the age of 102, he retired from regular active pastoral service. In 2025, he celebrated his 75th anniversary as a priest.

Following the death of Karl Haidle, who died at the age of 110 years and 60 days, Kant became the oldest living German man on 1 November 2025, at 109 years and 246 days. In an interview conducted in November 2025, Kant said that praying keeps him young. He had always had a strong faith; at the same time, however, he wonders (theodicically) why "the good Lord can allow so much nonsense, misfortune and malice in the world". On the occasion of his 110th birthday in February 2026, he received a personal letter of congratulations from Pope Leo XIV.

Kant died on 29 May 2026, at the age of 110 years and 92 days.
