= Andrzej Śliwiński =

- Bishop emeritus of Elbląg
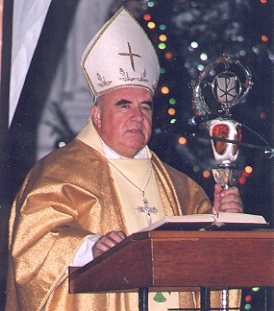
- Andrzej Śliwiński in 2008
- In office: 2003–2009
- Previous posts: Diocesan Bishop of Elbląg (1992–2003); Auxiliary Bishop of Chełmno (1986–1992)

Orders
- Ordination: December 17, 1961 by Kazimierz Kowalski
- Consecration: June 15, 1986 by Józef Glemp

Personal details
- Born: January 6, 1939 Werblinia, Pomeranian Voivodeship, Second Polish Republic
- Died: September 9, 2009 (aged 70) Elbląg, Poland
- Buried: St. Nicholas Cathedral
- Denomination: Catholicism
- Motto: Illum oportet crescere

Andrzej Józef Śliwiński (January 6, 1939 – September 9, 2009) was the first bishop of the Polish Roman Catholic Diocese of Elbląg. The diocese was established on March 25, 1992.

== Biography ==
Śliwiński was born in Werblinia, Poland, in 1939. He was ordained a Catholic priest on December 17, 1961.

Andrzej Śliwiński became the first Bishop of the Roman Catholic Diocese of Elbląg upon its creation on March 25, 1992. He remained the head of the diocese until August 2, 2003, and was succeeded by Elbląg's second bishop, Jan Styrna.

Bishop Andrzej Śliwiński died on September 8, 2009, in Elbląg, Poland, at the age of 70.
