= Diocese of Elbląg =

Latin Catholic ecclesiastical territory in Poland

Coordinates: 54.1586°N 19.3955°E

Diocese of Elbląg Dioecesis Elbingensis Diecezja Elbląska

Catholic
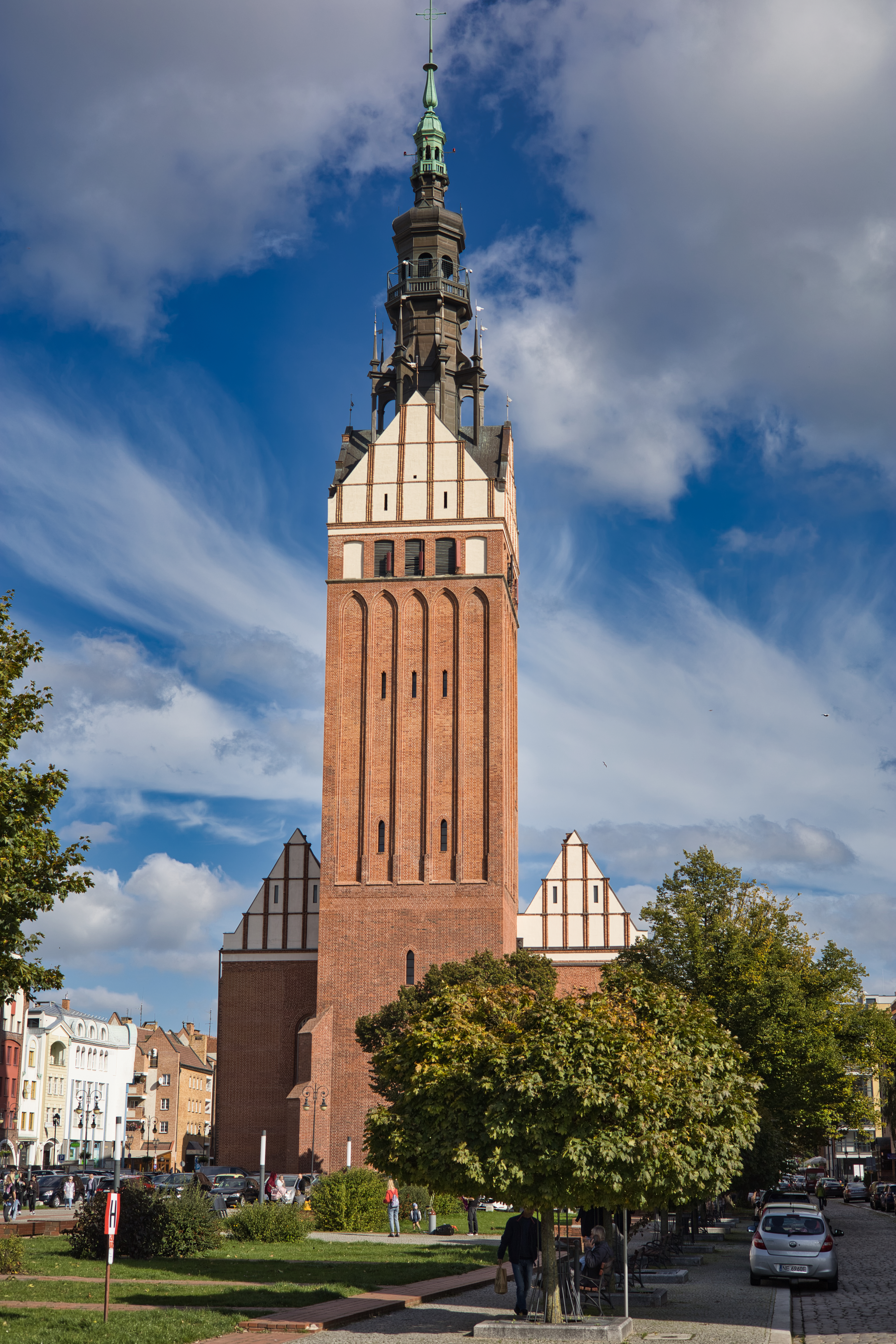
- Saint Nicholas Cathedral in Elbląg

Location
- Country: Poland
- Ecclesiastical province: Warmia

Statistics
- Area: 9,495 km^{2} (3,666 sq mi)
- Population: Total; Catholics: (as of 2021); 453,200; 441,200 (97,4%)

Information
- Denomination: Catholic Church
- Sui iuris church: Latin Church
- Rite: Roman Rite
- Cathedral: Katedra św. Mikołaja

Current leadership
- Pope: Leo XIV
- Bishop: Wojciech Skibicki
- Metropolitan Archbishop: Józef Górzyński
- Bishops emeritus: Józef Wysocki and Jacek Jezierski

Map
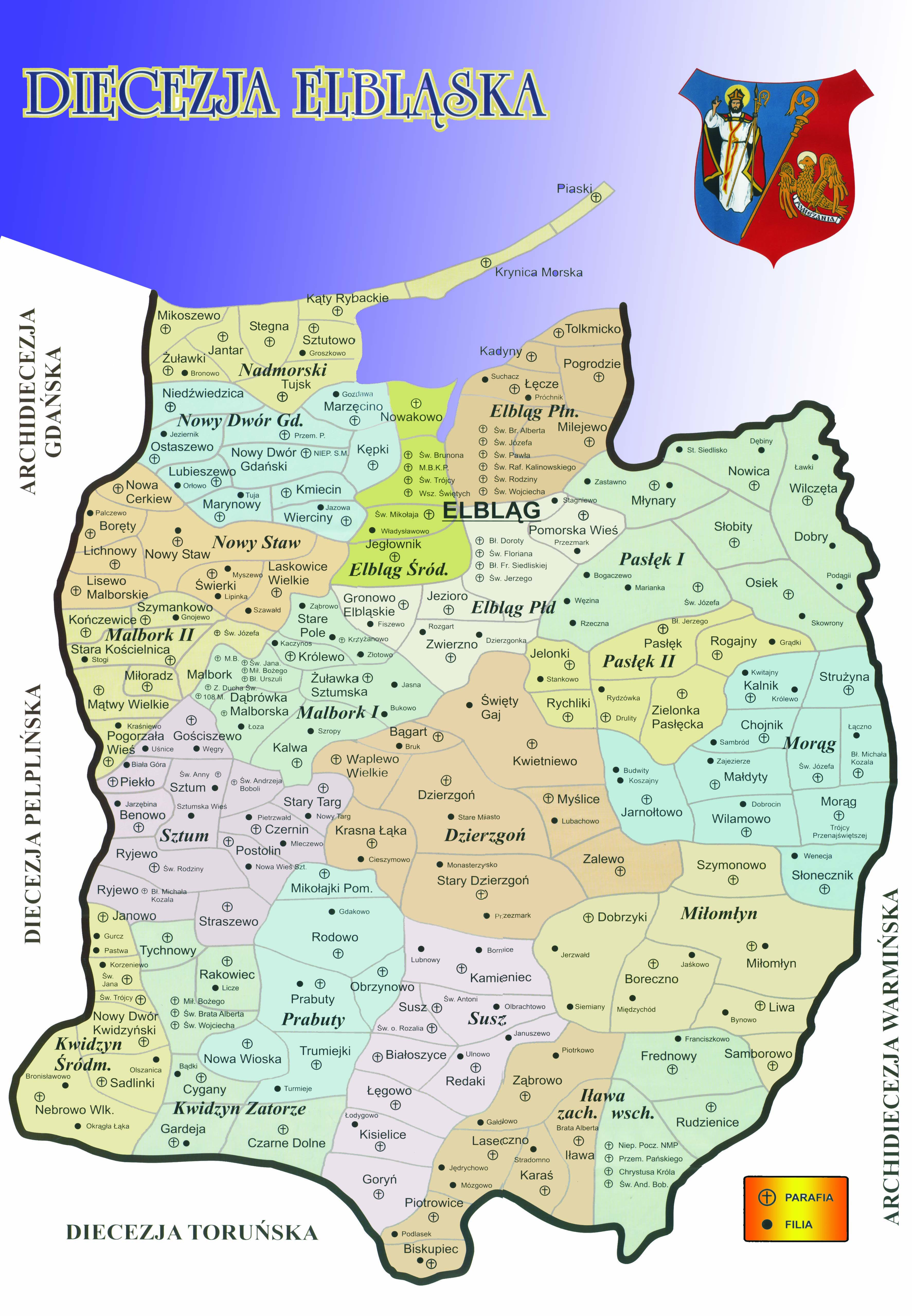
- Map of the Diocese

Website
- Website of the Diocese

The Diocese of Elbląg (Latin: Elbingen(sis)) is a Latin Church ecclesiastical territory or diocese located in the city of Elbląg in Poland. It is a suffragan diocese in the ecclesiastical province of the metropolitan Archdiocese of Warmia.

== History ==
The diocese was established on March 25, 1992, as the Diocese of Elbląg from the Diocese of Chelmno, Diocese of Gdańsk and Diocese of Warmia. According to the Catholic Church statistics, 28.4% of the population went to church once a week in 2013 which was the lowest rank ever since 1980.

== Leadership ==
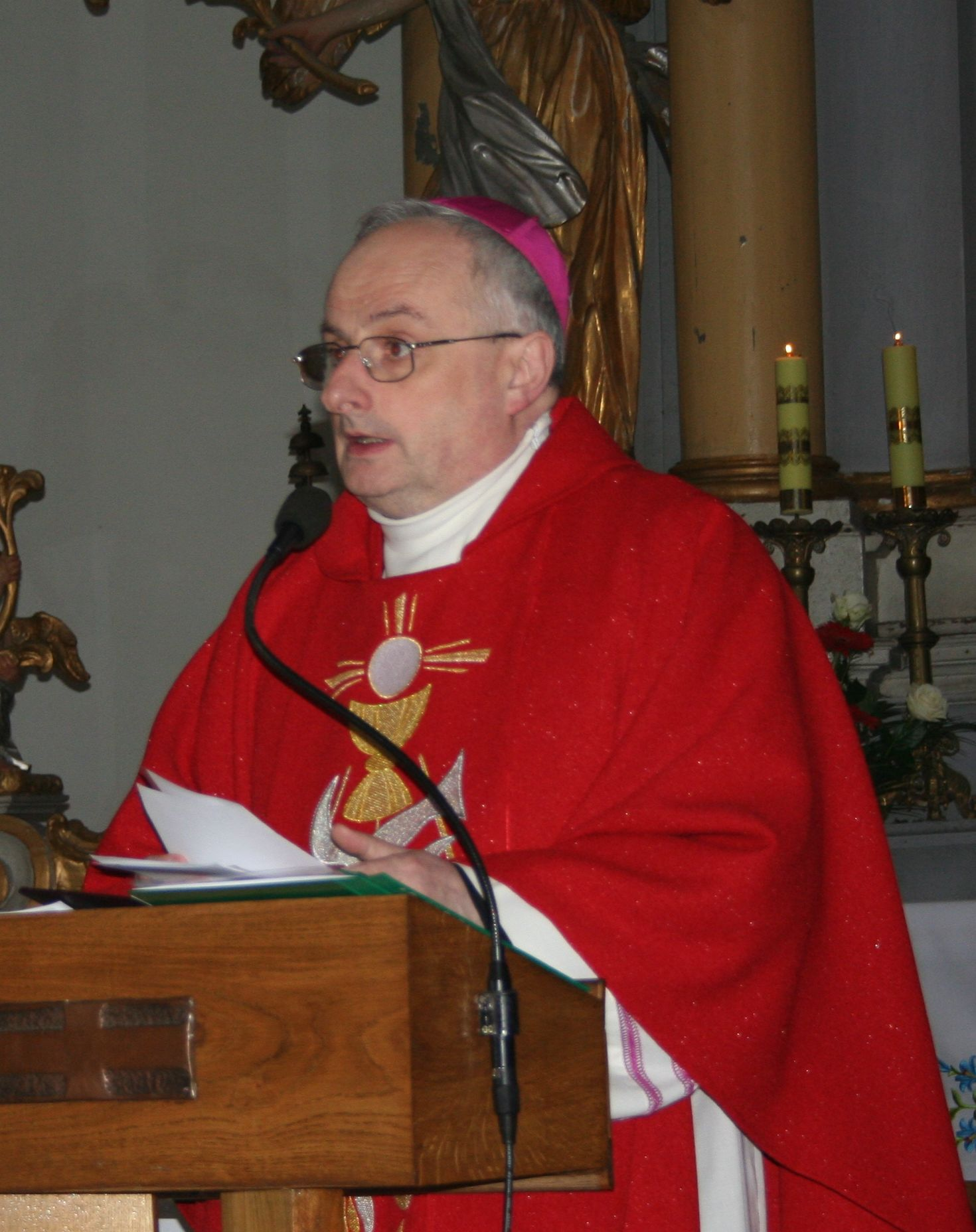
Bishop Jacek Jezierski

Bishops of Elbląg

- Bishop Wojciech Skibicki (since 2025.09.13)
- Bishop Jacek Jezierski (2014.06.08-2025.09.13)
- Bishop Jan Styrna (2003.08.02 – 2014.05.10)
- Bishop Andrzej Śliwiński (1992.03.25 – 2003.08.02)

== Special churches ==
Former Cathedrals:

- Konkatedra św. Jana Chrzciciela w Kwidzynie, Kwidzyn
- Konkatedra św. Wojciecha, Prabuty

== See also ==
- Roman Catholicism in Poland

== Sources ==
- GCatholic.org
- Catholic Hierarchy
- Diocese website
