= Die Rhöner Säuwäntzt =

German band

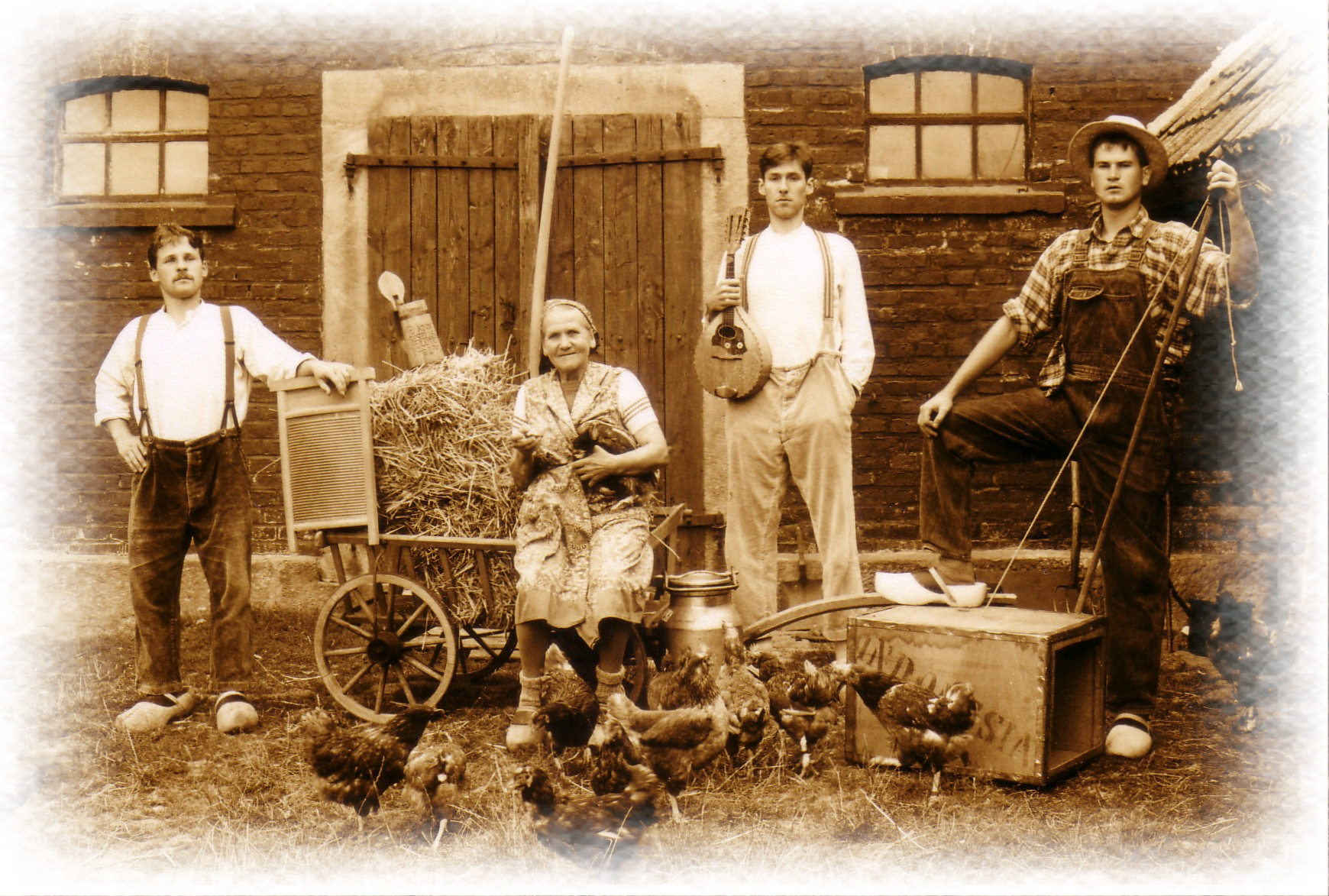
- Die Rhöner Säuwäntzt with Scholze Agatha 1994

Background information
- Origin: Eichenzell
- Genres: Skiffle, folk
- Years active: 1994–present
- Members: Martin Caba; mandoline, harmonica, vocals; Christoph Günther; washtub bass, vocals; Christoph Leipold; wash board, milk churn, vocals
- Website: www.sauwantzt.de

Die Rhöner Säuwäntzt are a skiffle-blues band from Eichenzell-Lütter in Hessen, Germany. The line-up consists of Martin Caba, Christoph Günther and Christoph Leipold playing Skiffle-Blues with lyrics based on Rhön Mountains dialect and other Hessian dialects varieties. The expression Säuwäntzt means pork belly and refers also to untidy or unruly children and youth.

== Background ==
The band started as a one-event session at a local festival in Fulda in 1994. An unexpected success led the members to continue working together. The band members have a blue-collar background and express this in their lyrics and musical style. The band's motto, Musik von den Baumwollfeldern der Rhön, translates into Music played on the Rhön Cotton Fields. The band members present themselves in hillbilly costumes, with corduroy trousers, braces and wooden shoes, and the acts include story telling and musical comedy on stage. Among the musical instruments in use are milk churns, electric shavers and wrenches; sometimes brass elements are added as well. The musical styles besides the peasant blues include Latin American rhythms, techno and also German pop, and they sometimes also make ironic use of operetta lines and melodies or standards, adapting them in line with their hayseed image. The band has played at regional festivals and events in Germany. It has been presented in German TV and radio. Contributions to major festivals include among others Internationales Tanz und Folkfest Rudolstadt, Bardentreffen Nuremberg and the international street musician competition in Osnabrück. The band has been described as a peculiar folk music invention with both rural down-to-earth and anarchic aspects.

Die Rhöner Säuwäntzt Live 2006

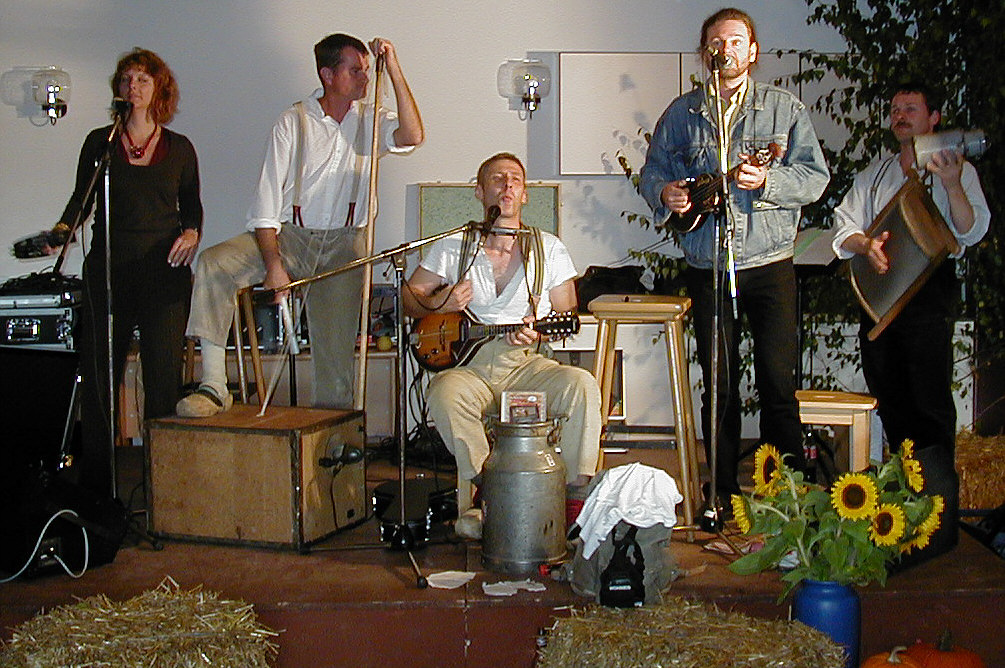
Session with friends

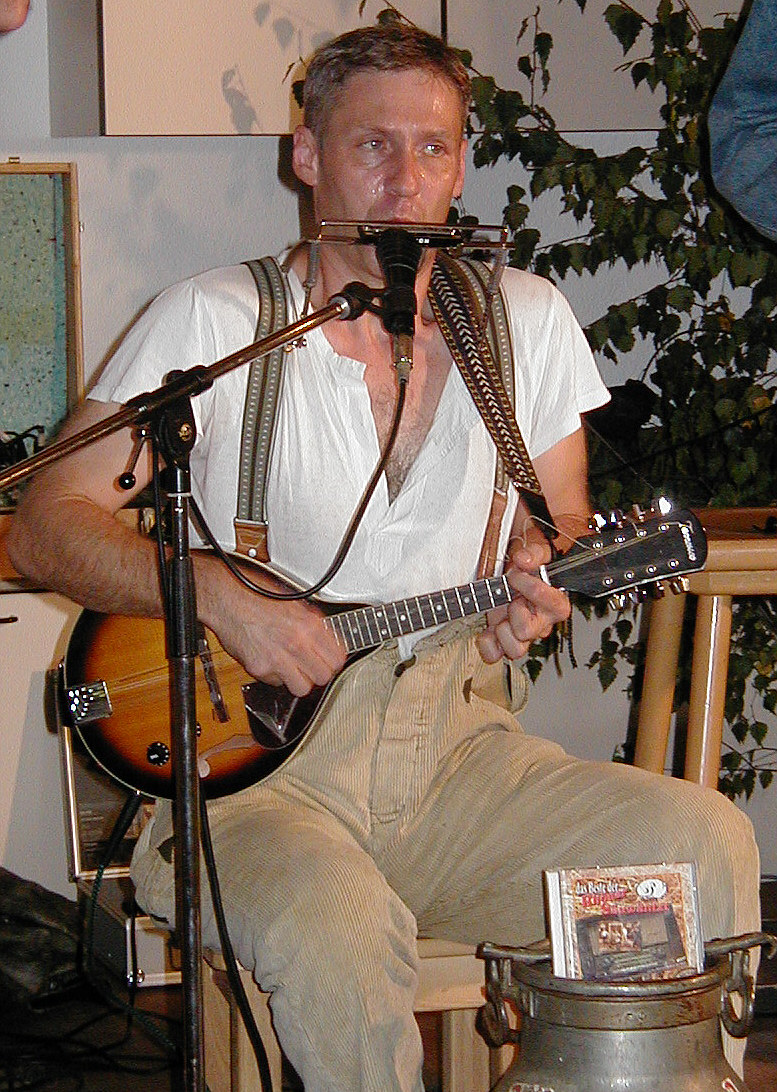
Frontman Martin Caba

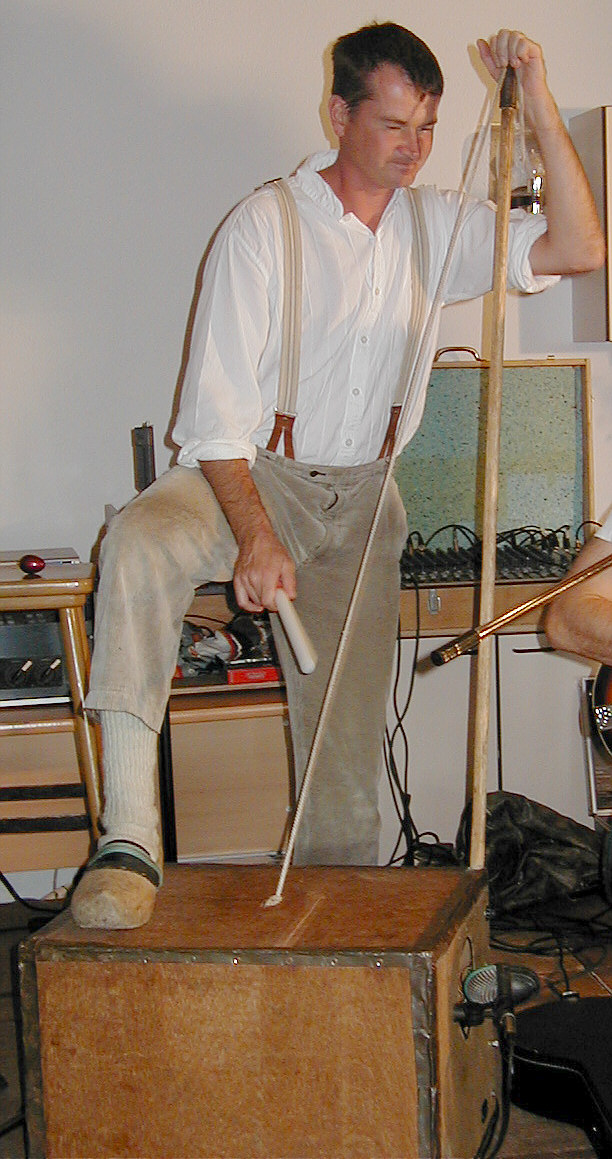
Christoph Günther, bass

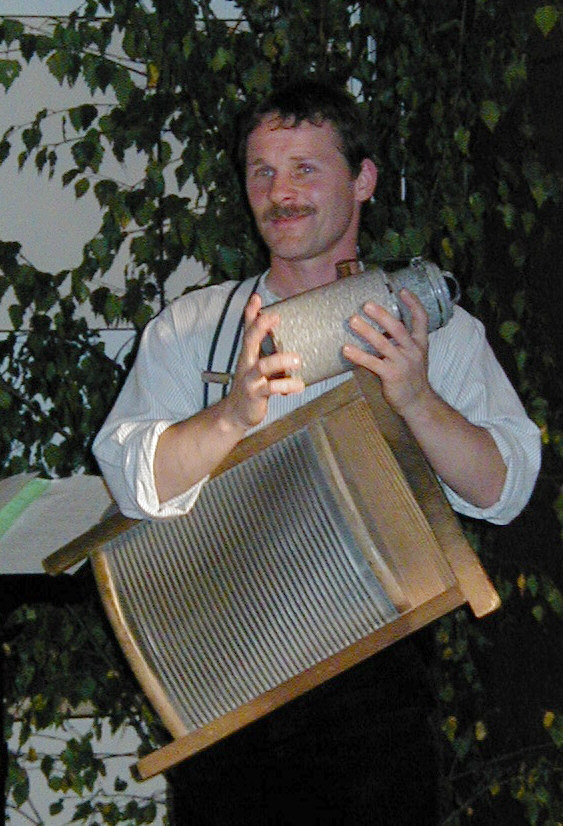
Christoph Leibold, wash board and milk churn

== Lyrics ==
The band's lyrics involve more or less burlesque and serious aspects of life and work in the countryside, some ribaldry, bumpkin blues and horseplay included. Thüringer Allgemeine highlighted a typical text example:

Da weht ein kalter Wind, da trifft man auch mal das Geierbirkhuhn, da hat Edeltraut mein Herz geklaut und im Canabisfeld (sic!) da steht ne Kuh

— There's a cold wind going, you might find black grouse, there Edeltraut stole my heart and a cow is to be found in the cannabis field

In 2014, the "Antiwindkraftlied" (anti-wind power song) went viral with anti-wind power activists in Germany after having been started on SoundCloud. The song is referring to negative impacts of a specific wind power project in the Rhön Biosphere Reserve.

== Discography ==
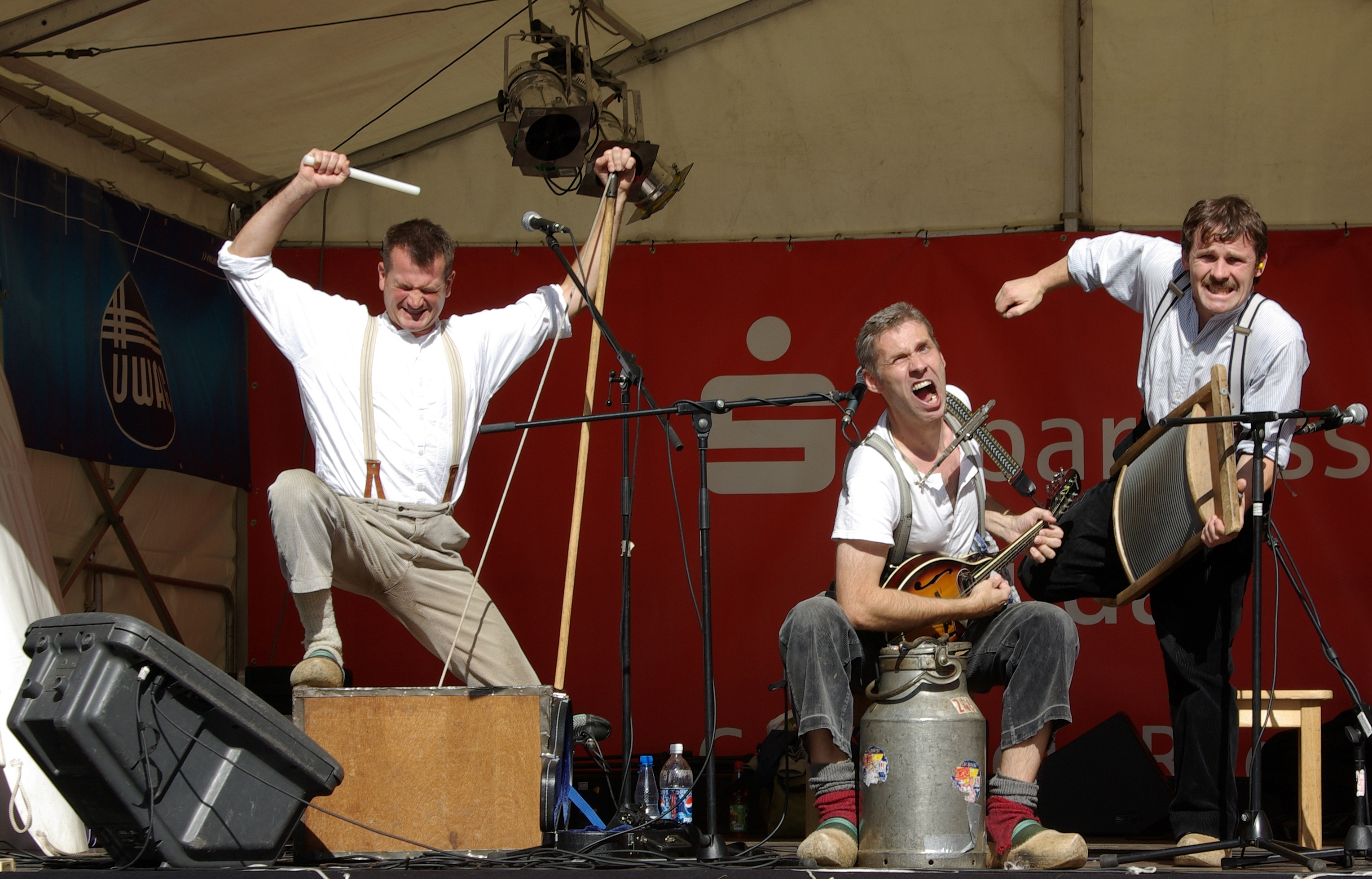
Die Rhöner Säuwäntzt live, September 2008, City-Festival in Fulda

- Die Rhöner Säuwäntzt; 1995 Rhön Records
- Die Indianer aus dem Biosphärenreservat (red Indians from the biosphere reserve); 1997 Musikverlag Caba
- Dorfweisheiten (village wisdom); 1999 Musikverlag Caba
- Die Botschafter der Rhön (Rhön ambassadors); 2000 Musikverlag Caba
- ... das Beste aus 10 Jahren; 2005 Musikverlag Caba, best of sampler
- Ballerwantzt am Guckaisee (beach party at Lake Guckai, close to Poppenhausen, Hesse); 2006; Musikverlag Caba
- Die Frauenversteher (woman whisperers); 2008 Musikverlag Caba
