= Fasanerie =

Baroque palace of the House of Hesse near Fulda, Germany

Coordinates: 50.5077°N 9.7080°E

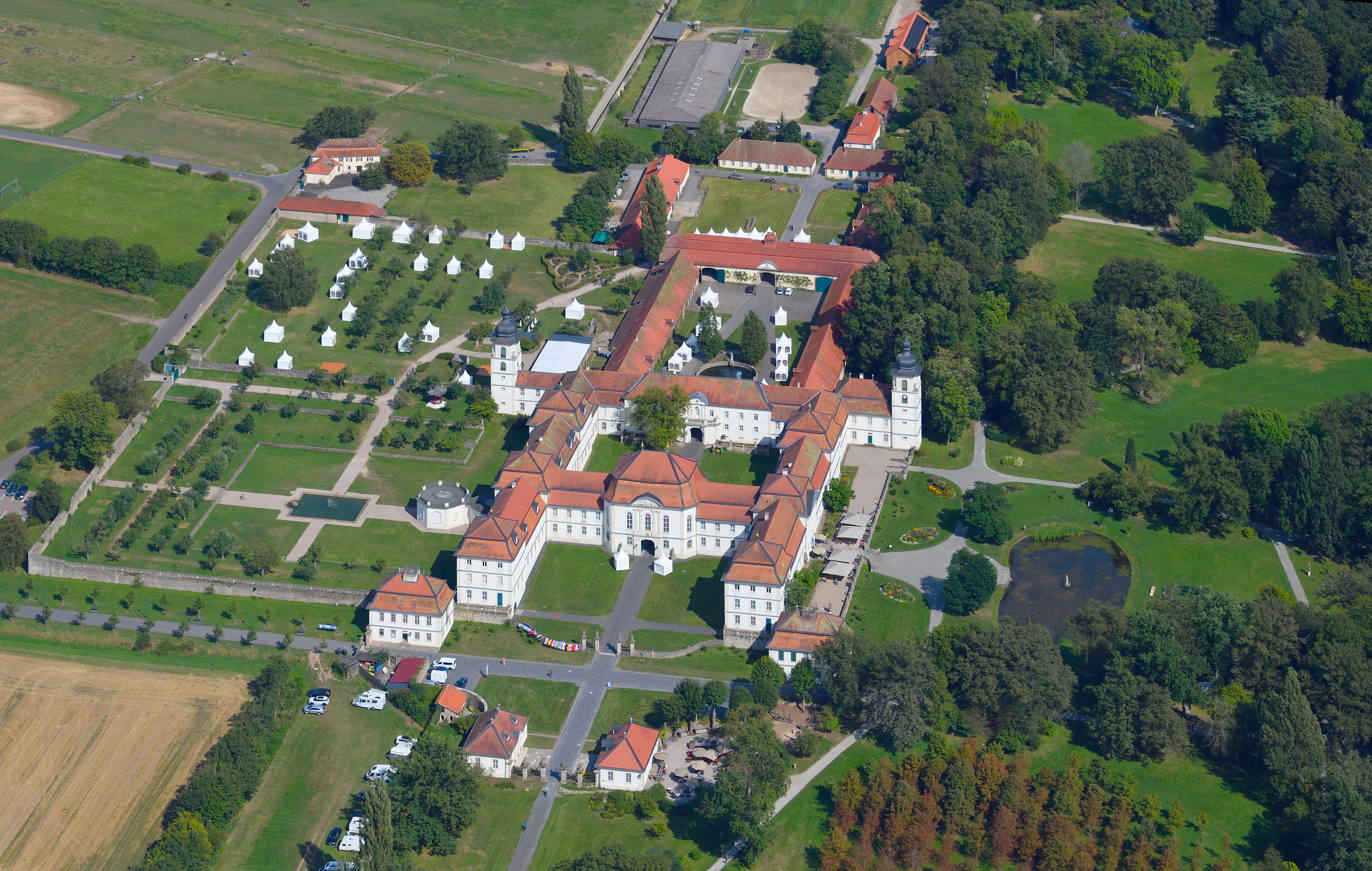
Schloss Fasanerie from the air

Fasanerie (German: Schloss Fasanerie) is a baroque-style palace complex near Fulda, Germany, in Eichenzell. Originally built as a modest hunting lodge in the countryside for the Prince-Abbots of Fulda around 1710, it was significantly expanded and transformed into a grand residence in the mid-18th century. Following various shifts in ownership due to secularization and political changes, it became the private residence of the princely Hesse-Kassel family and served as a summer residence until the early 20th century. Damaged during the Second World War, the palace was restored and converted into a museum in 1972. Today, it houses one of Germany's most significant private art collections of classical art, along with exhibits of Baroque and 19th-century decor, including rare porcelain and historical portraits. The museum advertises itself as "most beautiful Baroque palace" of Hesse (German: Hessens schönstes Barockschloss).

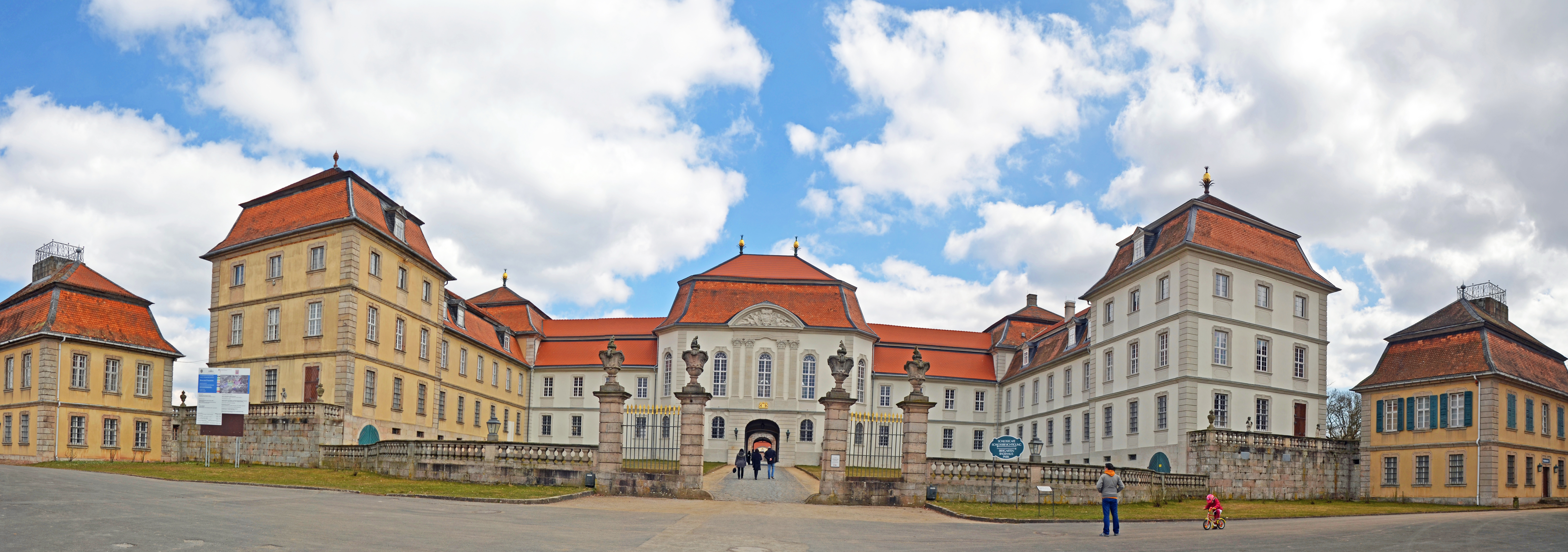
The entrance front of Fasanerie palace (during the renovations, with the middle and right in the original white colour)

== Location ==
Fasanerie palace is located about seven kilometres outside the city of Fulda, on a small hill surrounded by woods. Encompassing an area of about 100 hectares, the palace is surrounded by an English Landscape garden, itself enclosed by a natural stone wall up to six meters high.

== History ==
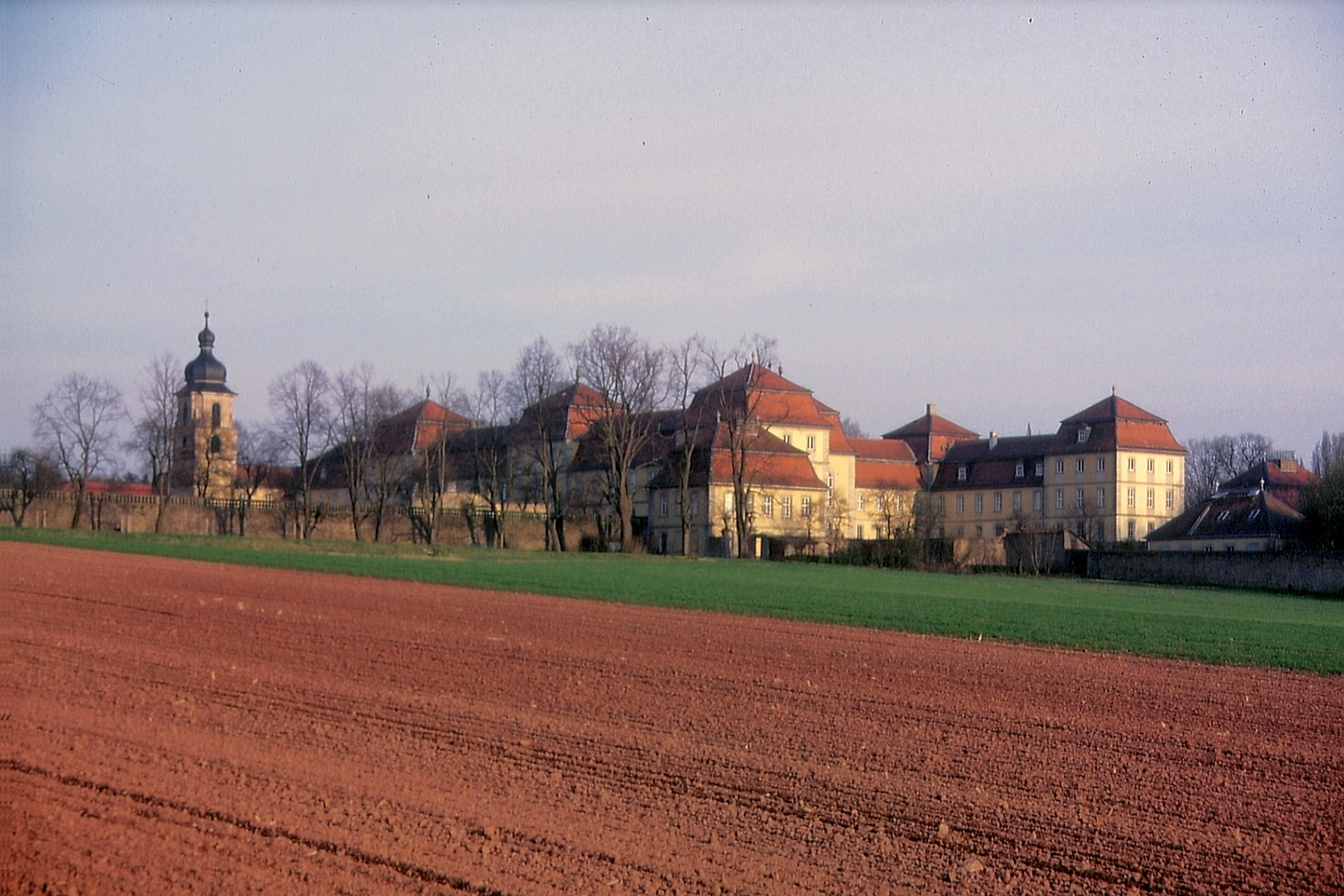
Fasanerie palace from a distance

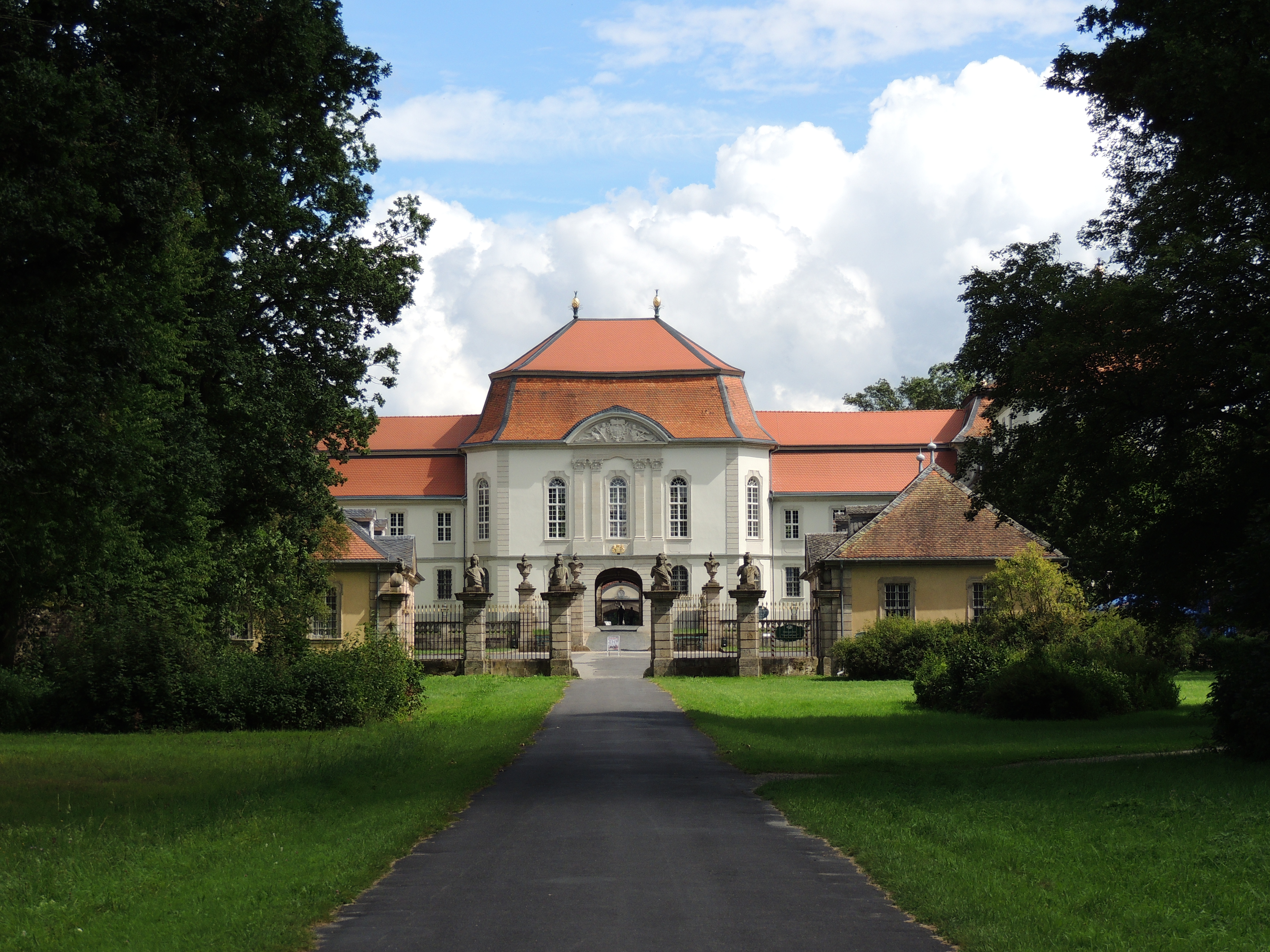
The entrance of Fasanerie palace

=== The Prince-Abbots of Fulda ===
Between 1708 and 1704, a modest country manor was built by order of the Prince-Abbot of Fulda, Adalbert von Schleifras. The hunting lodge was named Fasanerie, German for Pheasantry, meaning an enclosed area for pheasants and other game. The design was likely made by the architect Johann Dientzenhofer, who also designed Fulda Cathedral and Schloss Weißenstein. The manor is still the nucleus of the palace complex.

From 1730, Prince-Abbot Adolph van Dalberg started expanding the manor, and also renamed the palace into Adolphseck (German: Schloss Adolphseck). Another few years later, Dalberg's successor, the first Prince-Bishop of Fulda, Amand von Buseck, engaged court architect Andreas Gallasini to further magnify and extended the palace. Construction continued until 1757 when the palace reached its current dimensions surrounding two courtyards.

For the remainder of the 18th century, the palace served as the main summer residence of the Prince-Bishops.

=== Electors of Hesse ===
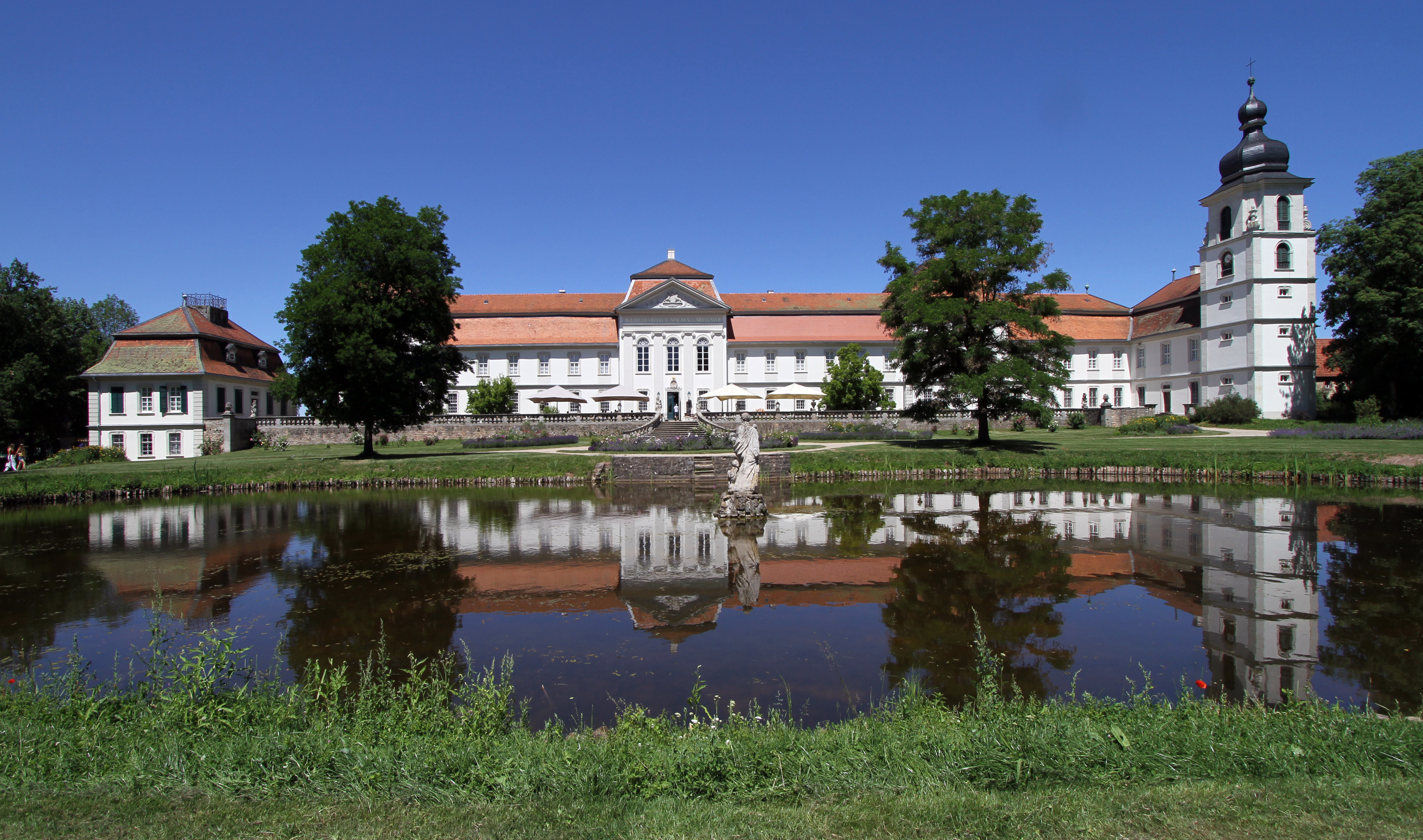
The south wing of Fasanerie palace (2019)

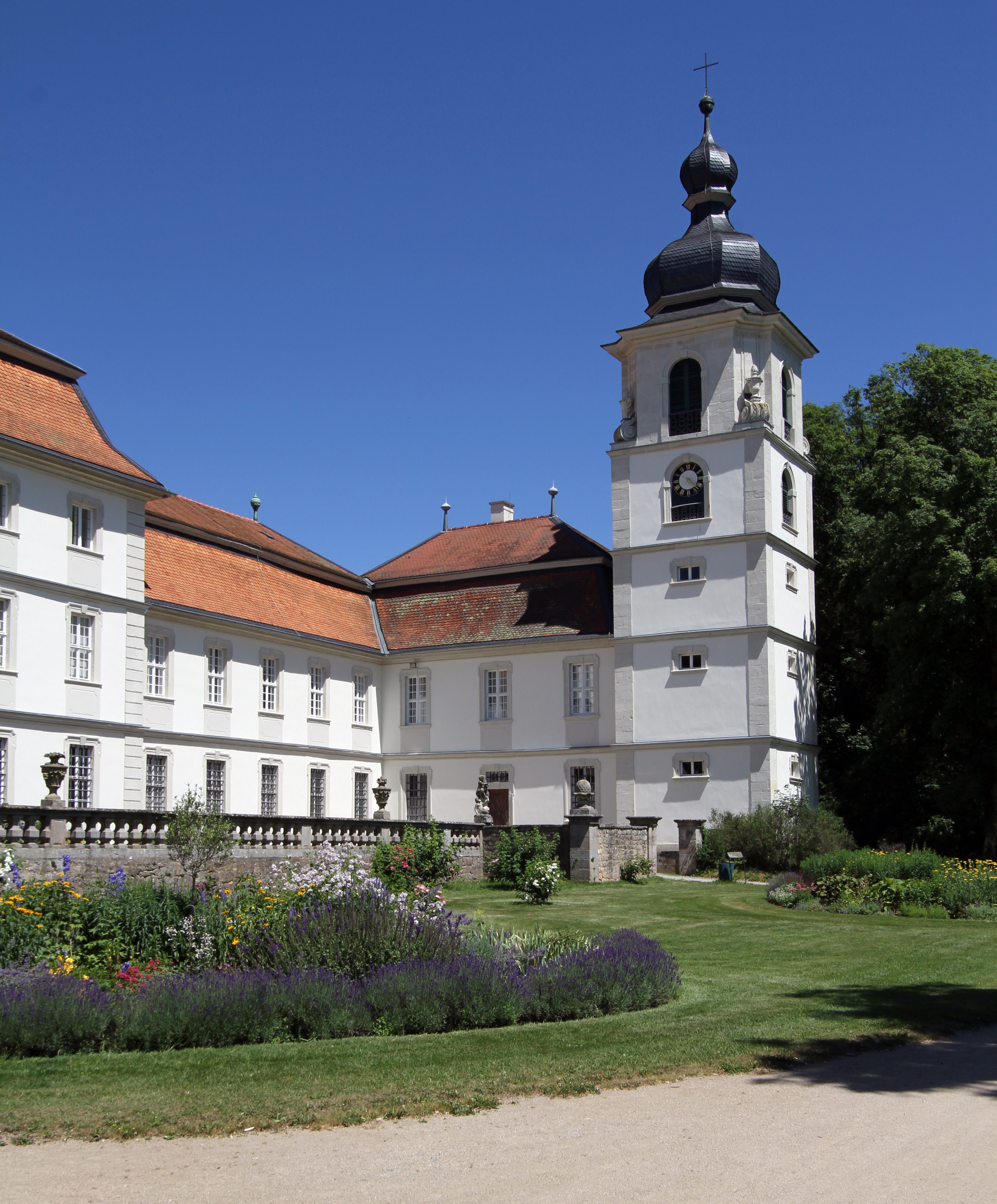
One of the palace towers (2019)

In 1803, the Prince-Bishopric of Fulda was secularized and became the Principality of Nassau-Orange-Fulda, which was handed over to William Frederick, the son and heir of William V, Prince of Orange, the ousted stadtholder of the abolished Dutch Republic after the Batavian Revolution of 1795. The principality was only short-lived as it was annexed by Napoleon in 1806. It became part of the Grand Duchy of Frankfurt in1810. Following the Congress of Vienna, the province of Fulda was transferred to the Electorate of Hesse in 1816. During these turbulent times, the palace was used amongst others as a military hospital by Russian troops during the Napoleonic Wars.

Elector William I showed no interest in the palace, but his son, Elector William II, did. With help of the architect Johann Conrad Bromeis, the palace was reconstructed and refurbished the interior in a neoclassical style between 1825 and 1827 (although the main staircase still remained its old baroque splendour). Also, the gardens were redesigned by Wilhelm Hentze in an English landscape garden style.

The palace served as an Electoral summer residence until the mid-19th century. During the Austro-Prussian War of 1866, the Electorate like the Duchy of Nassau and the Kingdom of Hannover sided with Austria, and lost. Soon after, the Prussia annexed the Electorate and the palace was expropriated.

=== House of Hesse-Rumpenheim ===
After decade long negotiations with Prussia, in 1878, the palace was returned to prince Frederick William of Hesse-Rumpenheim as his private property together with the Prince-Bishop's city palace in Fulda and other estates. The prince was member of a cadet branch of the House of Hesse-Kassel and was the presumptive heir to the last Elector as his sons were excluded from succession, because of his morganatic marriage. It served him and his wife, Anna of Prussia, as a summer residence for many years. After the prince died in 1884, princess Anna continued to use the palace during the summer until she died in 1918, and was buried in the Fulda cathedral (the only woman to have this honour).

During the Second World War, the castle suffered severe damage. After the war, prince Philipp of Hesse restored the palace and moved the princely art collections here. Before the war, the collections were exhibited together with pieces of the Hessian state art collection in the Landgrafenmuseum in Schloss Bellevue in Kassel. But after the destruction of this palace, the collections were split. The first rooms were opened to the public in 1951, but the palace is only since 1972 officially a museum. Prince Philipp also renamed the palace back to Fasanerie.

Extensive renovation works for several million euros started in 2010. As part of this, the palace regained its original white colour, after having been painted ochre yellow in the 1970s.

=== Hessian House Foundation ===
Today, Fasanerie palace is owned by the Hessian House Foundation (German: Hessische Hausstiftung), a family foundation of the princely house of Hesse. The palace is open to public as a museum. In the southern wing, visitors can admire the neoclassical state rooms and the art collection. The art collections includes an extensive array of ceramics and small artworks, large sculptures, and portrait busts. The porcelain collection contains pieces from all early European porcelain factories.

Particularly notable are eleven (mostly posthumous) portraits of the military governors of Maastricht. Nine of these larger-than-life oil paintings were commissioned by Baron Hobbe Esaias van Aylva and painted by Johann Valentin Tischbein. They originally hung in the Government Palace in Maastricht until 1798, after which the last governor, prince Frederick of Hesse-Kassel, had them transferred to Schloss Rumpenheim in Offenbach am Main, Hesse. After the Second World War, the Rumpenhheim palace was severely damaged and in ruins, and the paintings moved to the Fasanerie palace.

==== Gallery: the military governors of Maastricht ====
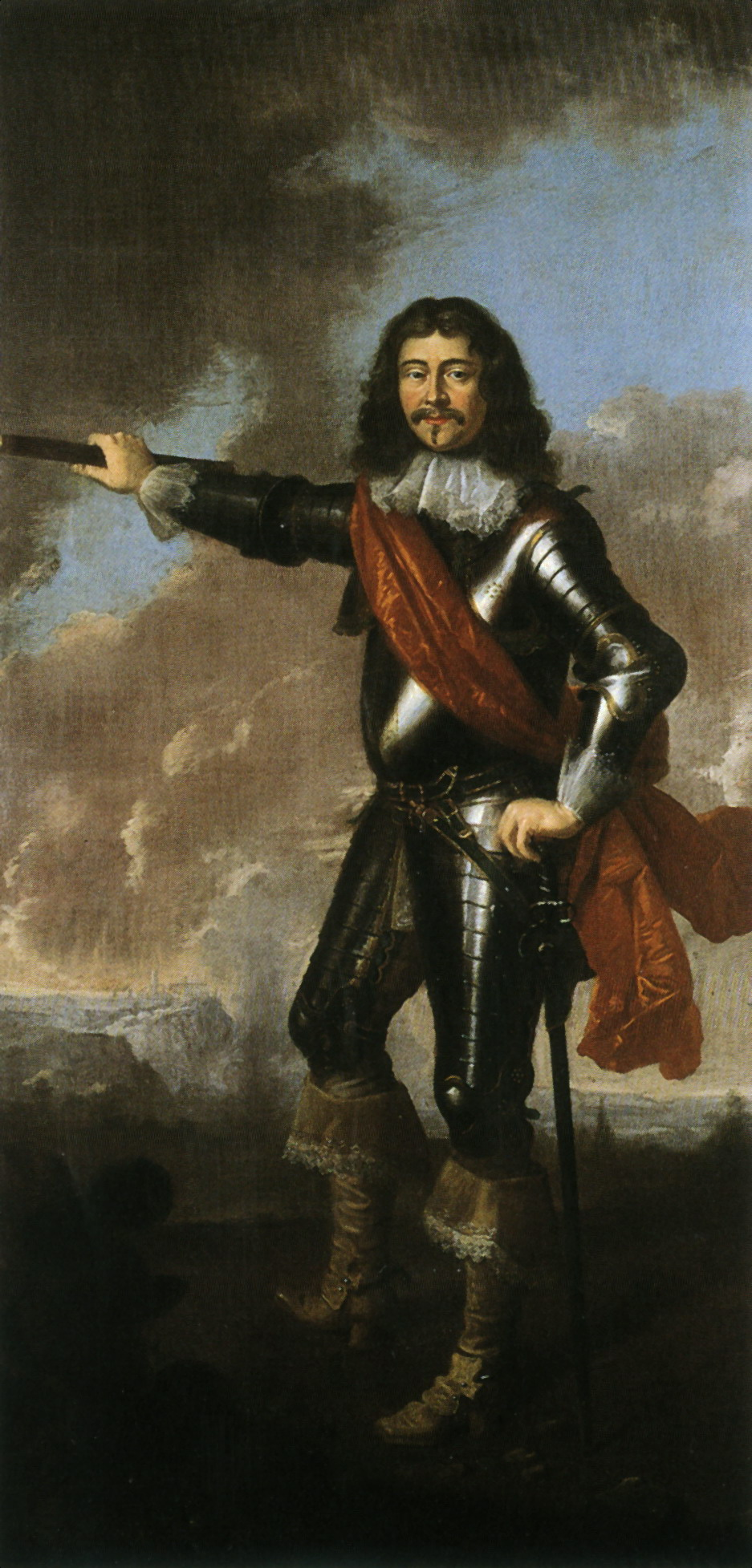
Frédéric Maurice de La Tour d'Auvergne, Duc de Bouillon

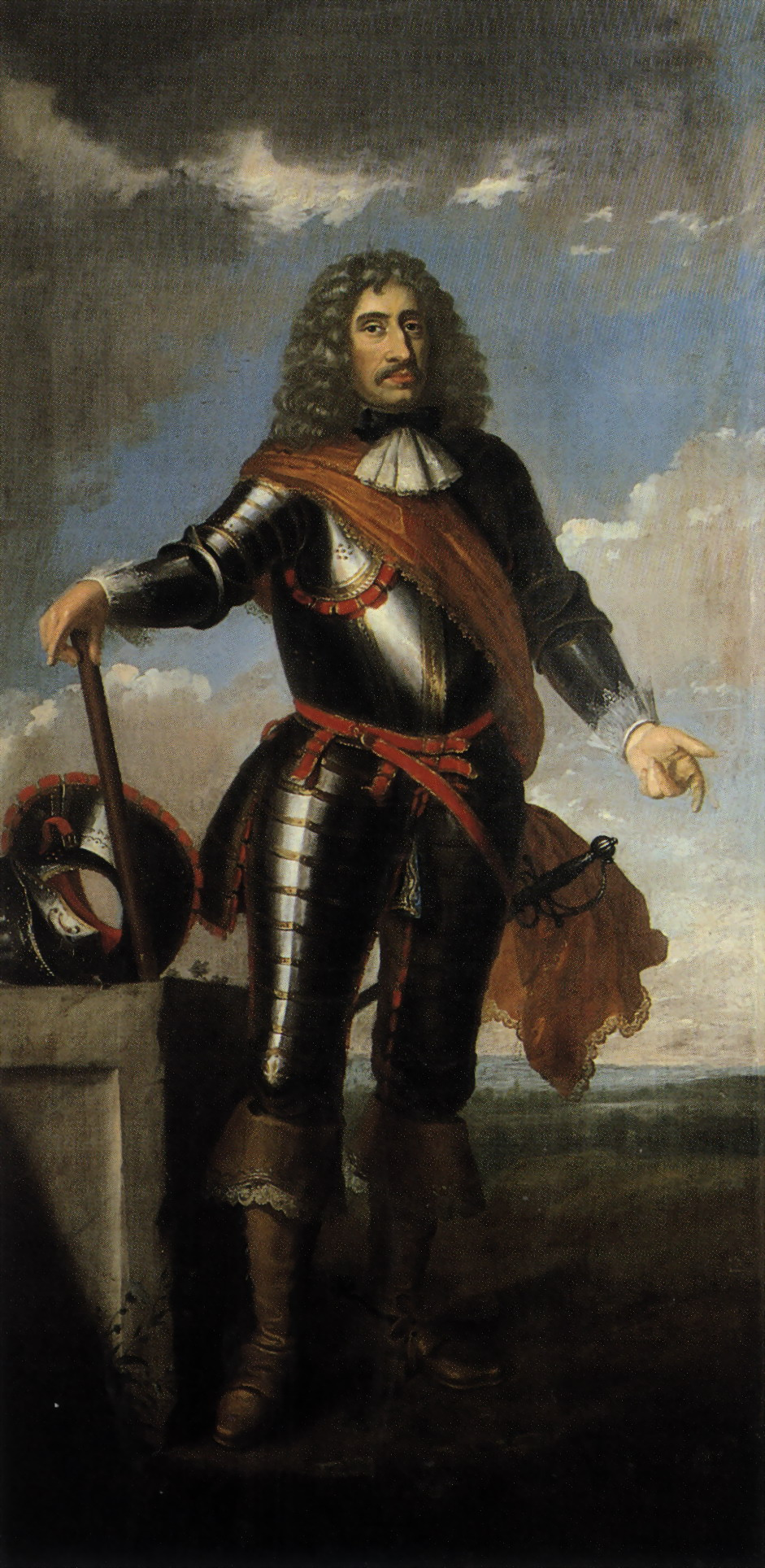
Johann Albrecht II, count of Solms-Braunfels

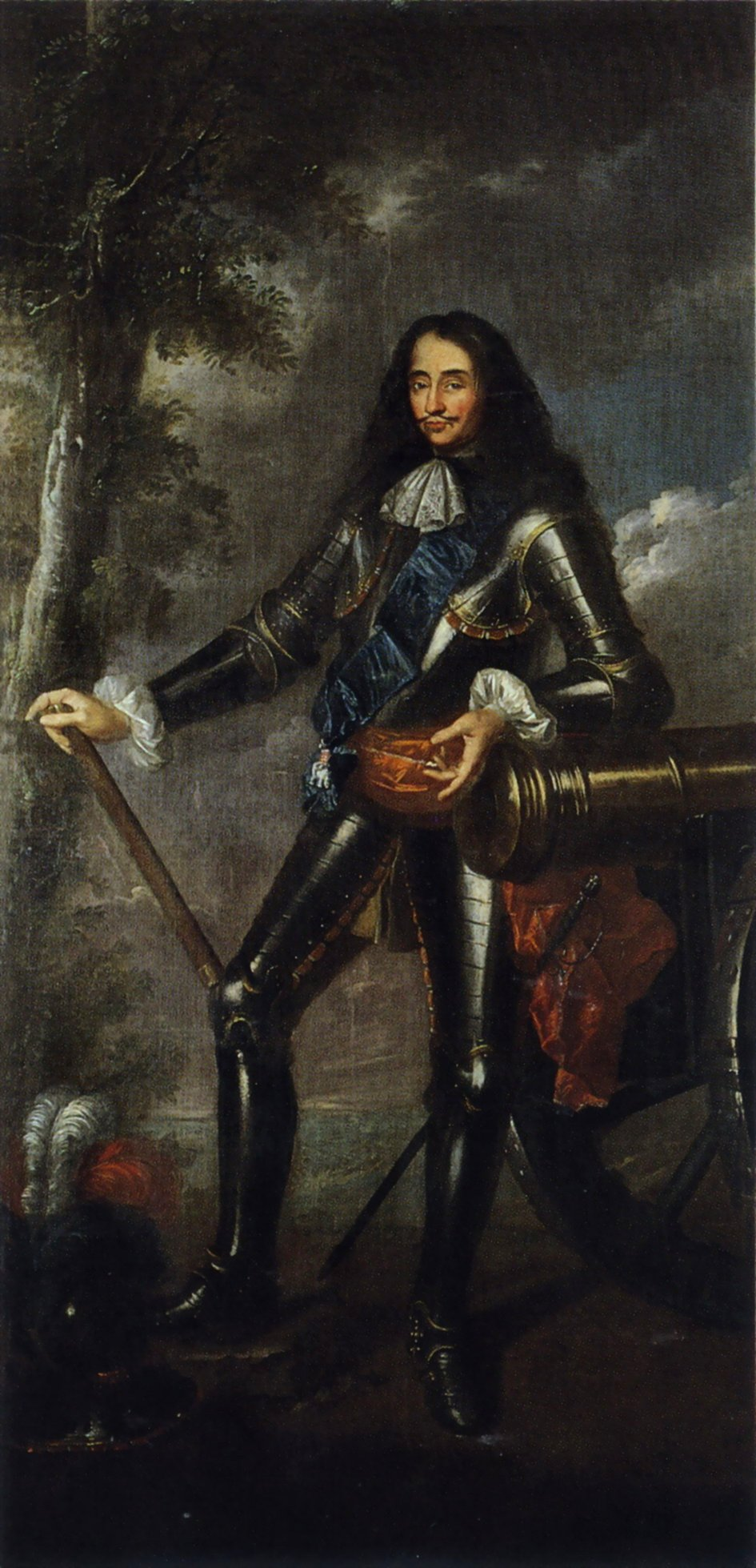
Fredercik Magnus van Salm

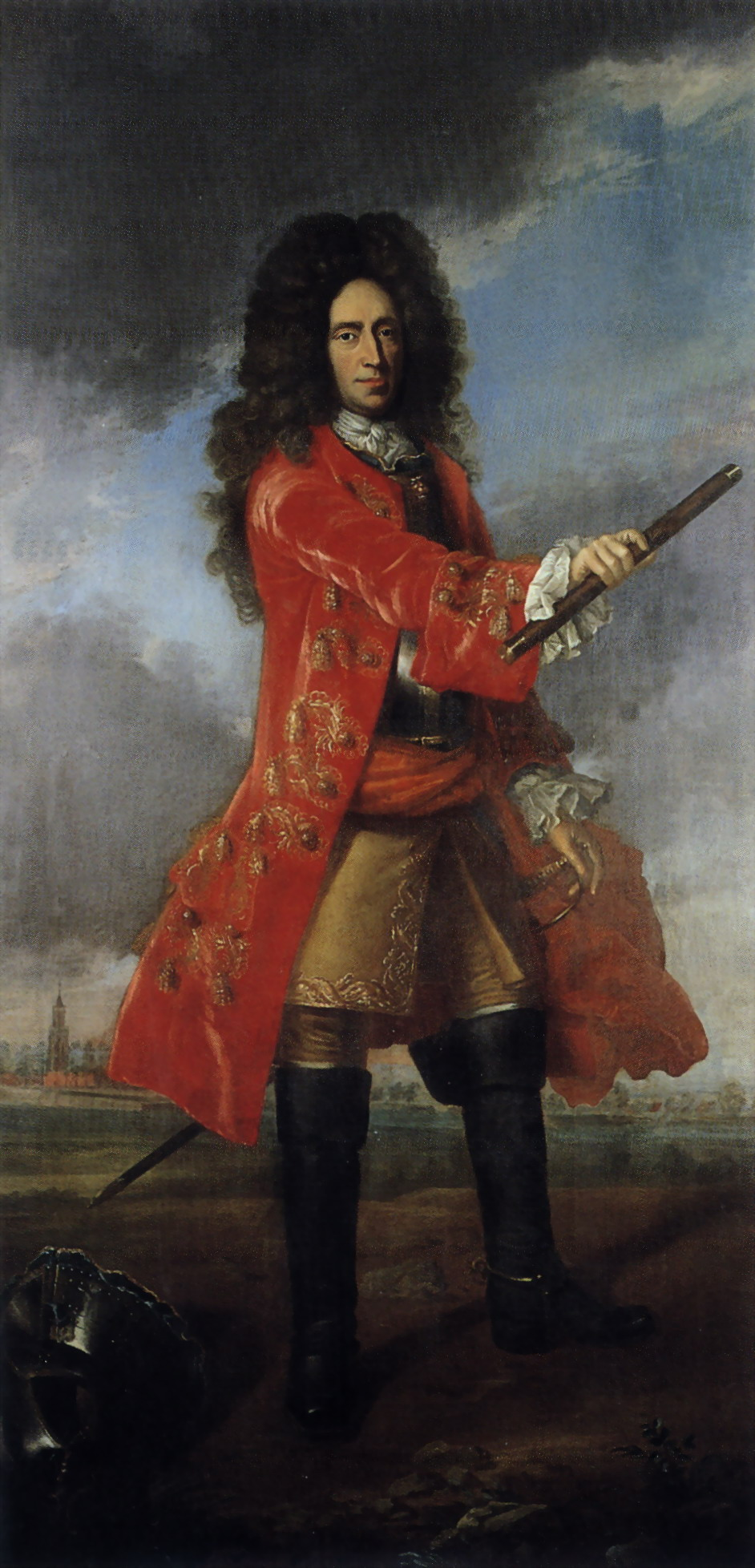
Prince Georg Friedrich of Waldeck

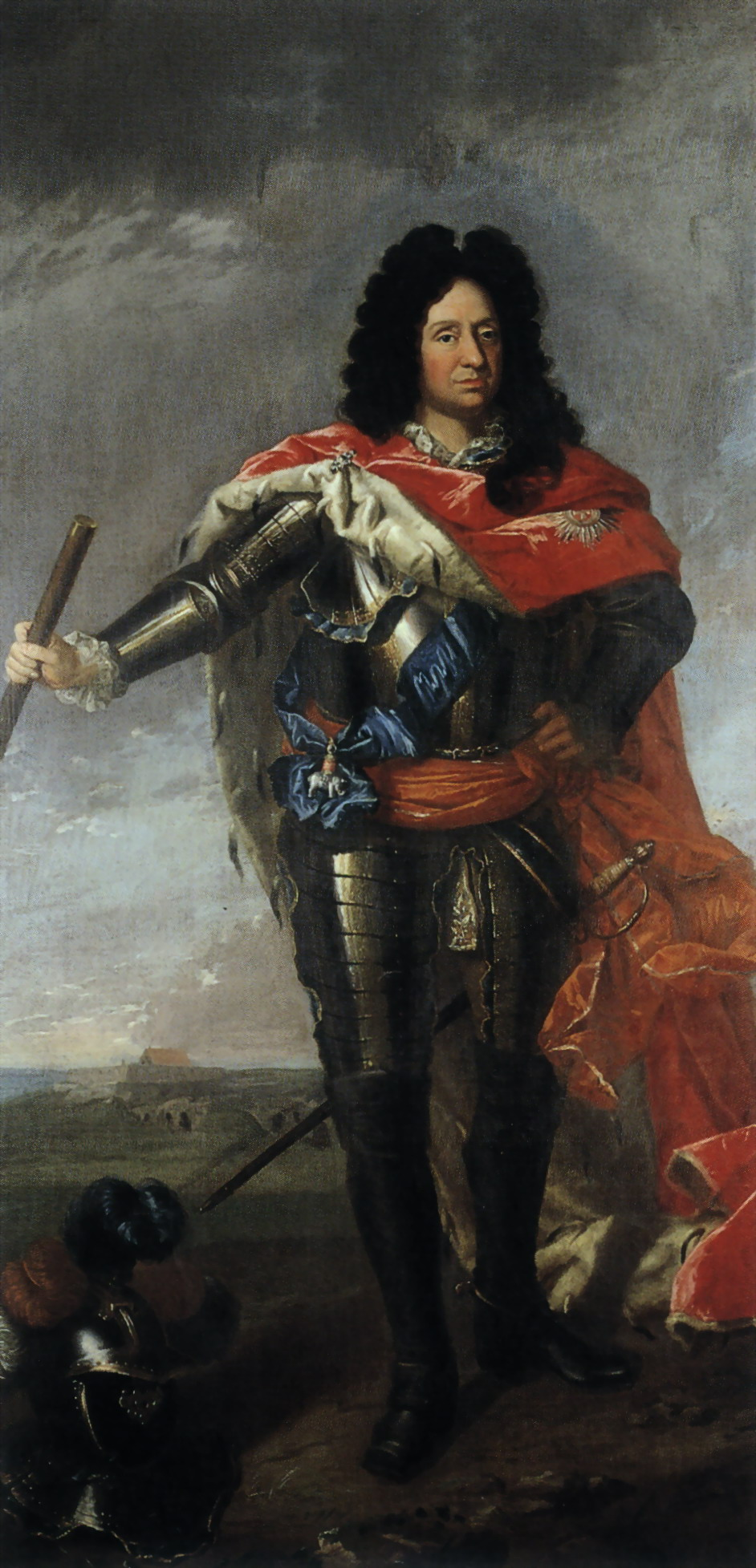
John Adolphus, Duke of Schleswig-Holstein-Sonderburg-Plön

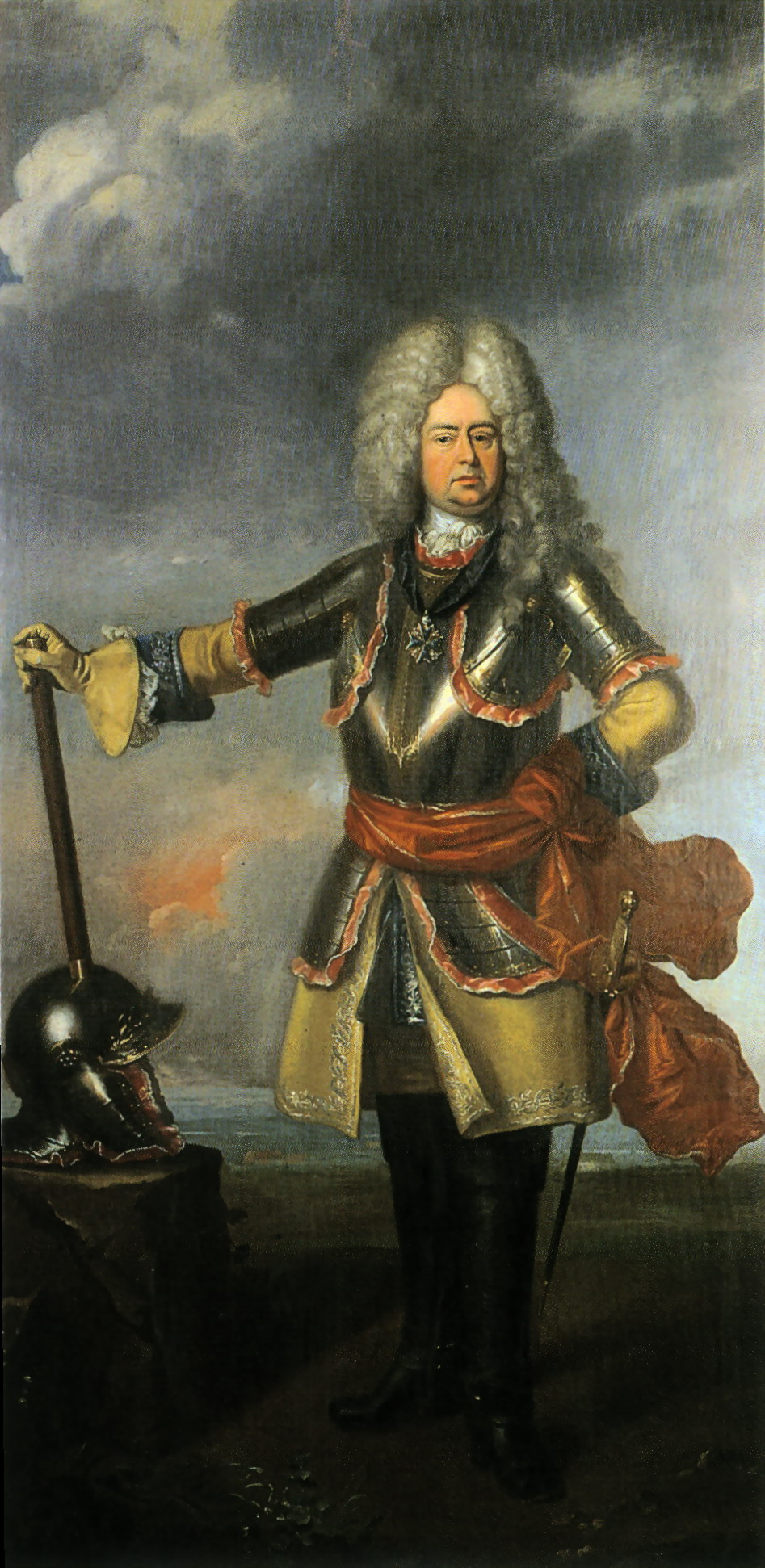
Daniël Wolff, baron van Dopff

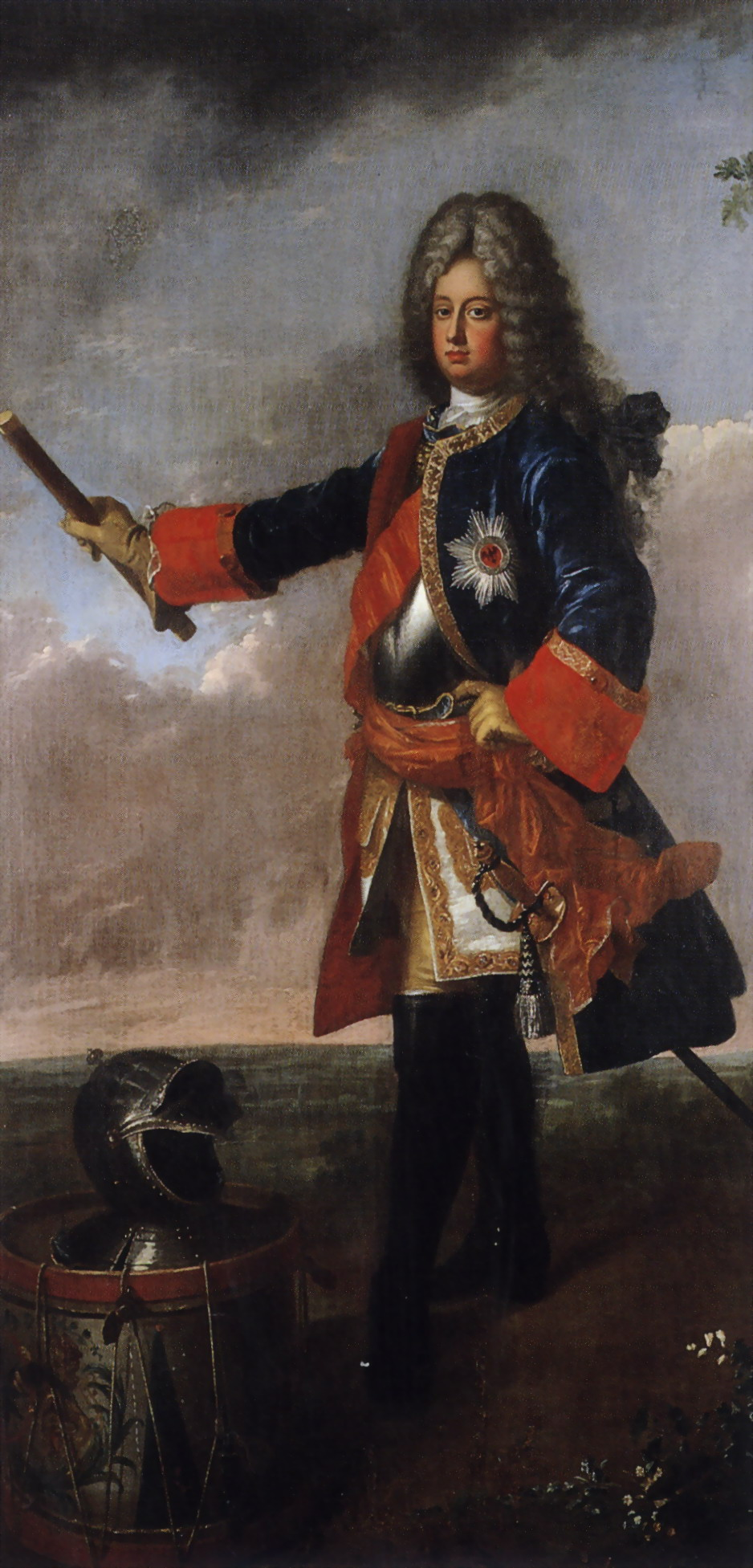
Claude Frédéric t'Serclaes, Count of Tilly

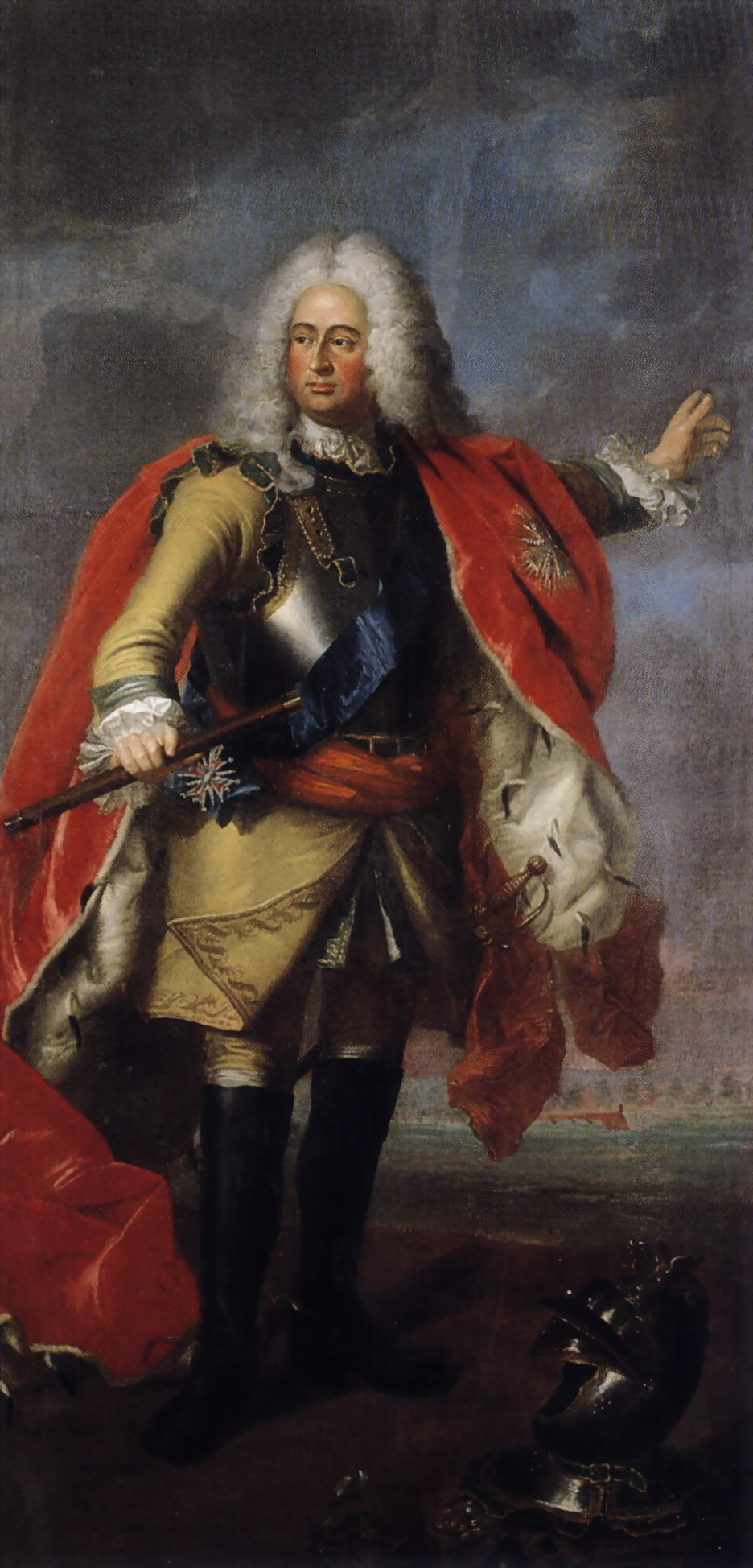
William VIII, Landgrave of Hesse-Kassel

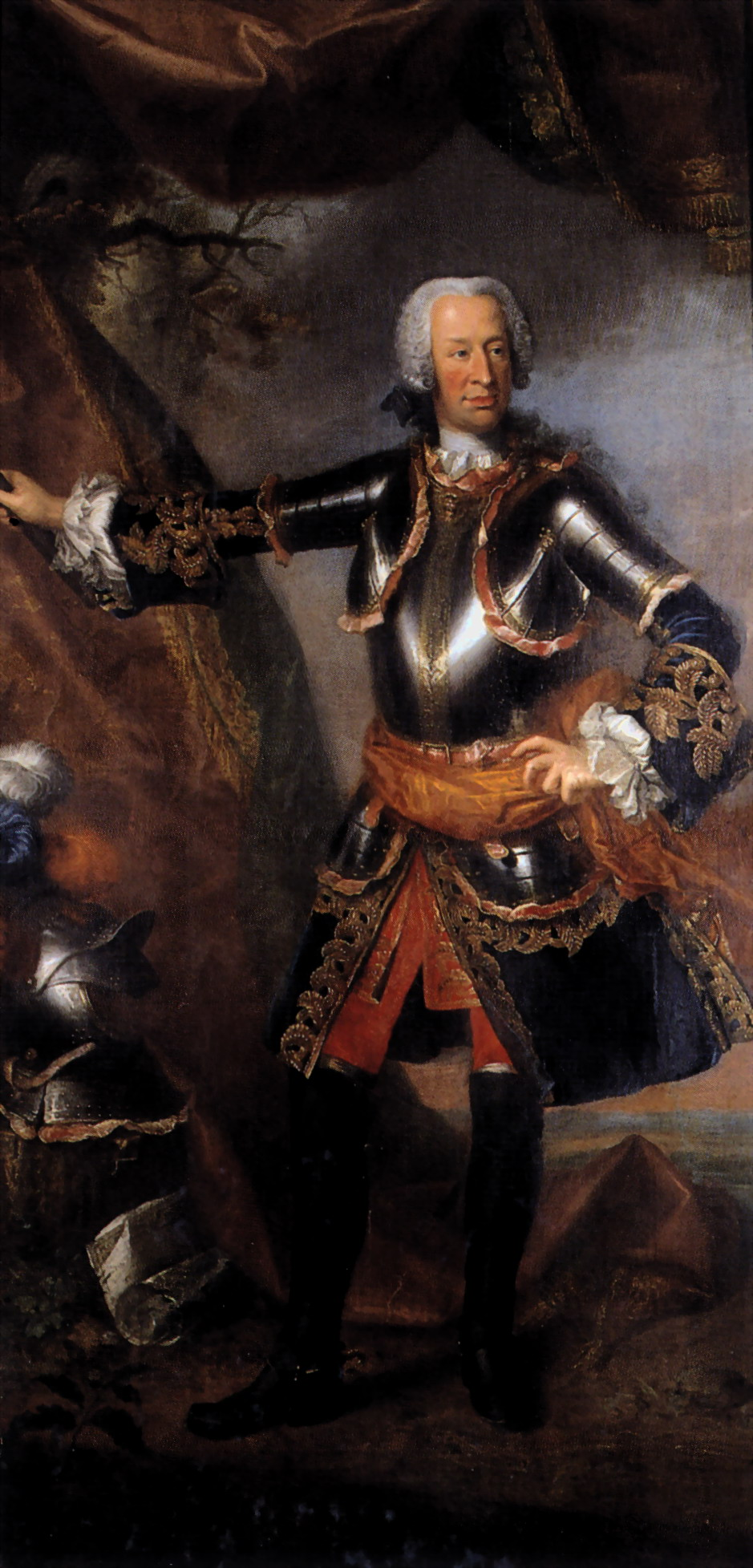
Hobbe Esaias, baron van Aylva

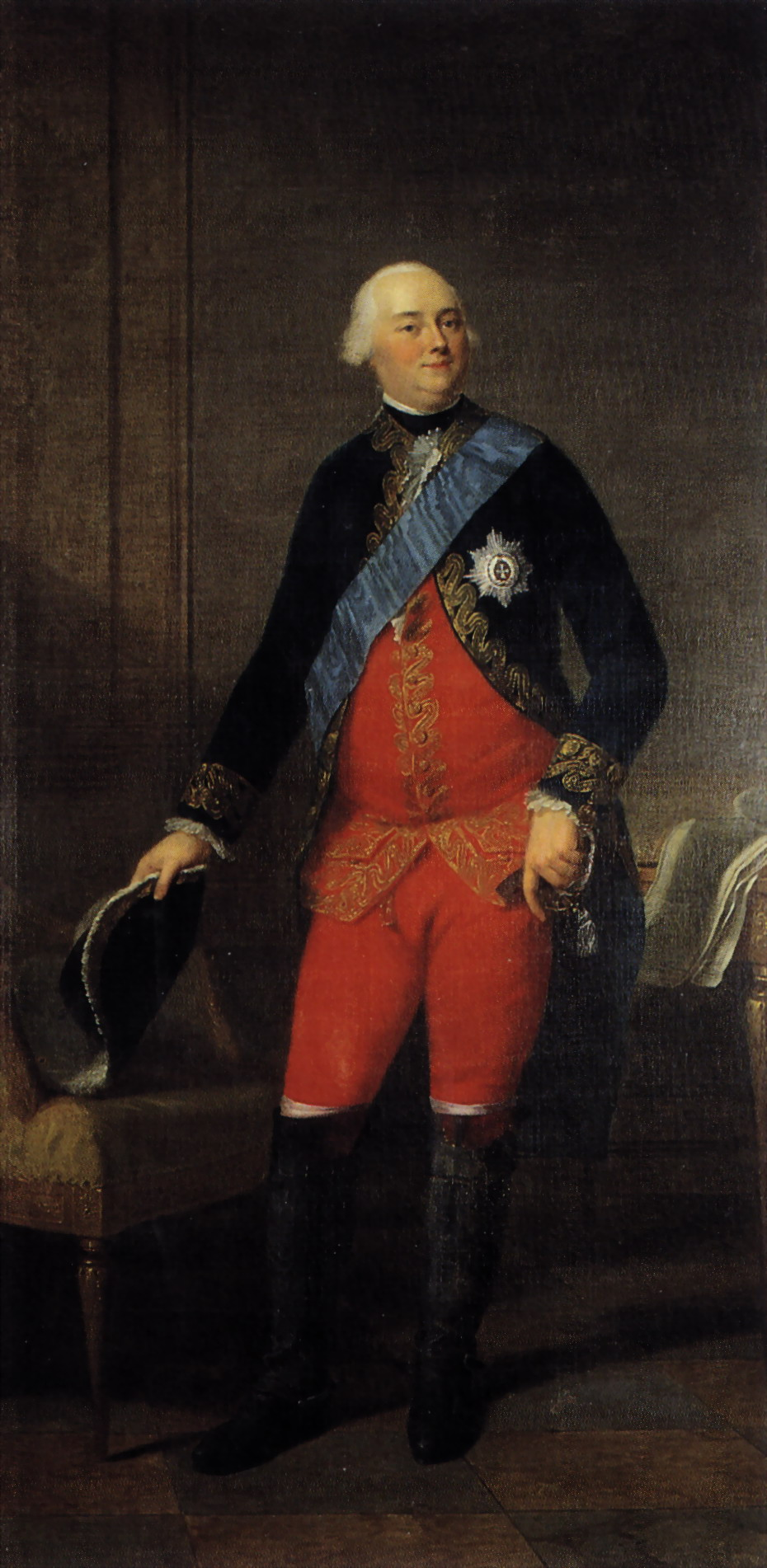
Charles Christian, Prince of Nassau-Weilburg

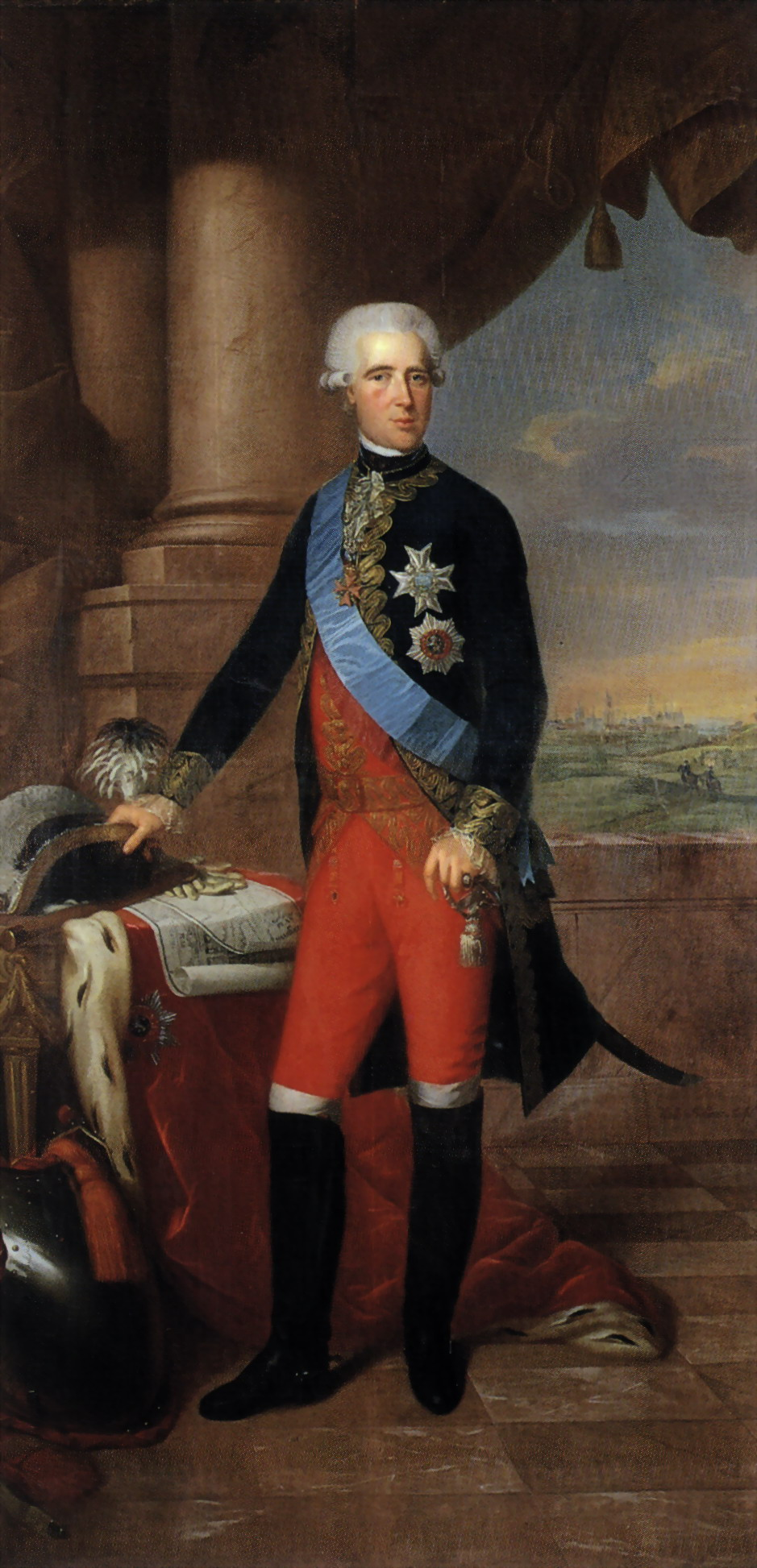
Prince Frederick of Hesse-Kassel

== Architecture ==
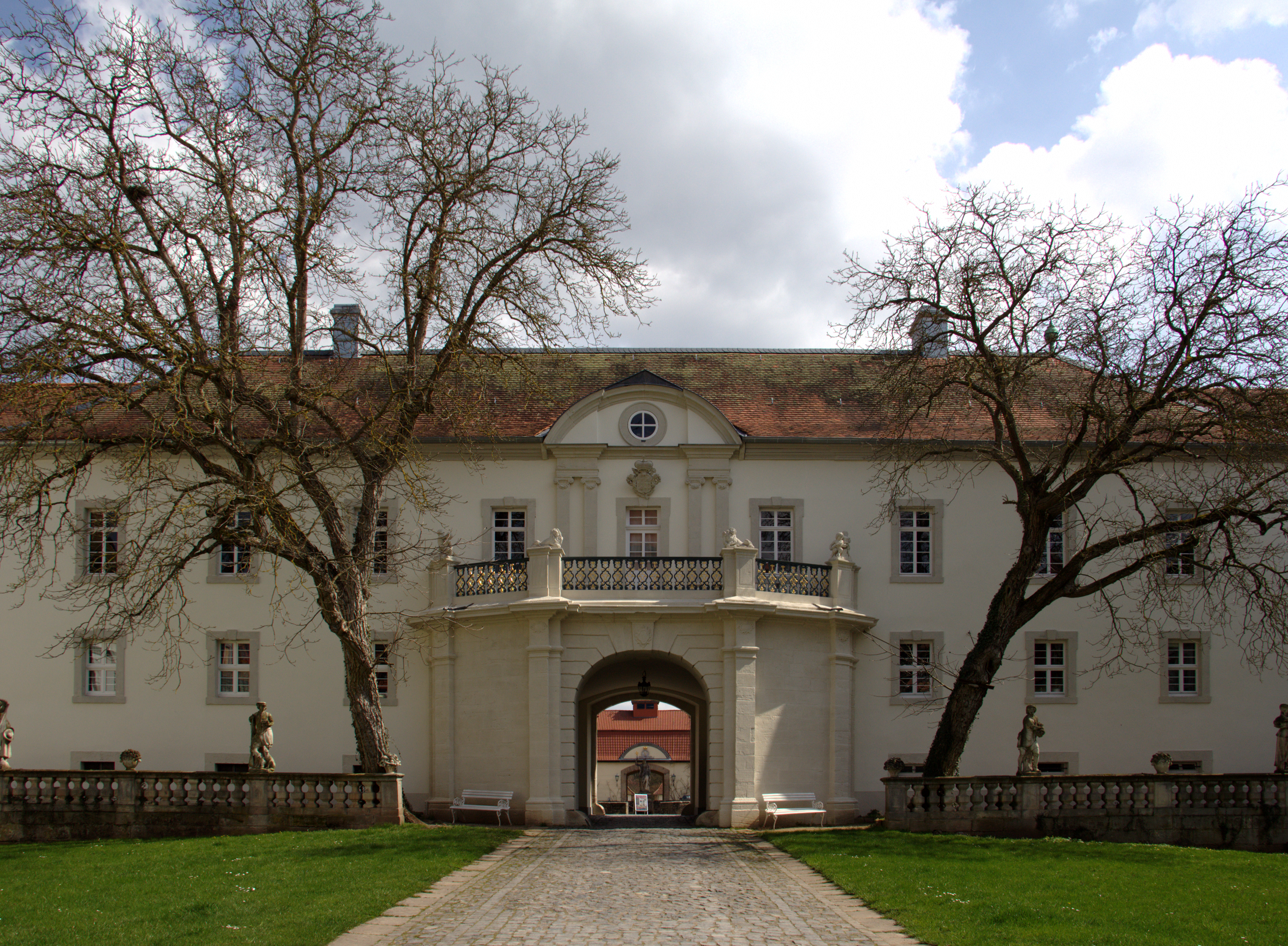
The nucleus of the palace, the old country manor also known as the little palace

The palace is a complex of several buildings arranged around a succession of courtyards. The original structure is the old country manor (known as the little palace (German: Schlösschen) built by Fulda’s cathedral architect Johann Dientzenhofer), centrally located within the complex and flanked by two towers to the north and south. To the east are two service courtyards with a stud farm that remains in operation to this day, while to the west lies the nearly square inner courtyard and the court of honour, bordered at the centre by the main hall, both of which date back to the expansions by Gallasini.

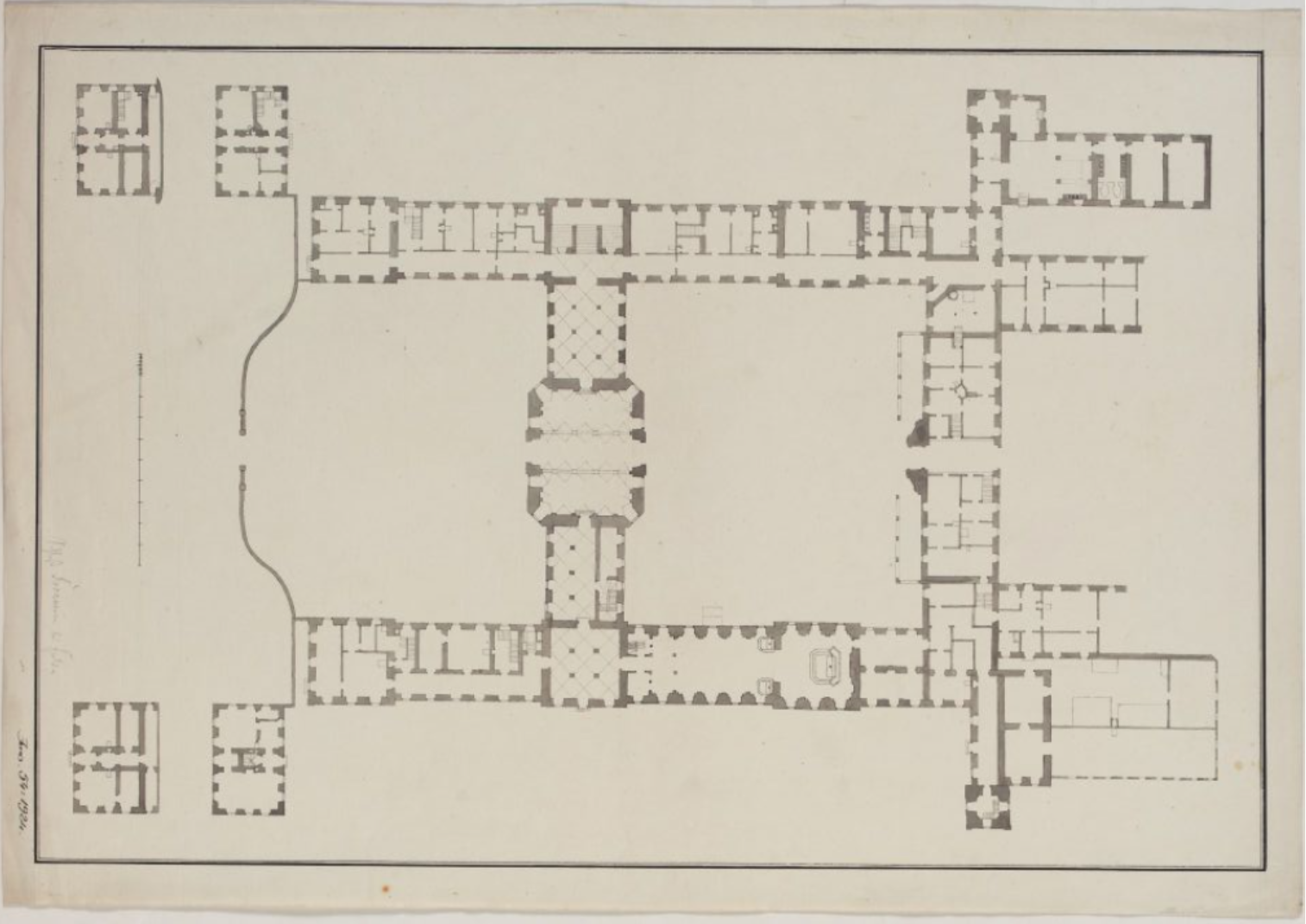
Ground floor plan (1822)

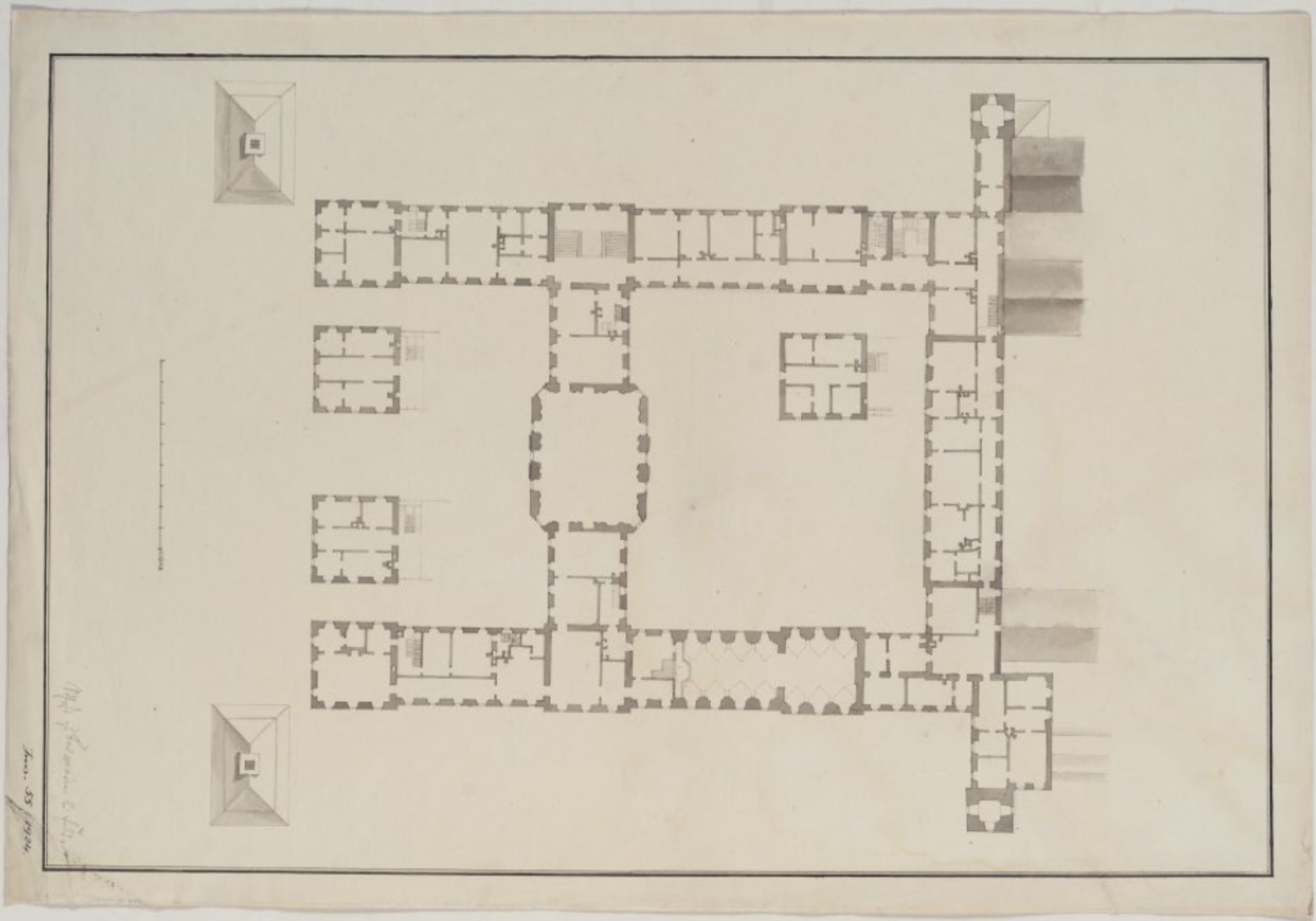
First floor plan (1822)

== Garden ==
The castle was once surrounded by a baroque-style garden, which can now only be recognized in its basic layout. However, features like the Japanese tea house still testify to the splendour of the late Baroque era. The baroque garden design was made by Benedictus Zick. During the renovations of Elector William II, the garden was transformed into an English landscape garden by William Hentze.

The estate includes a large park with a wide variety of tree species, designed in part with the involvement of the naturalist Carl Linnaeus. This park is enclosed by a natural stone wall up to six meters high.

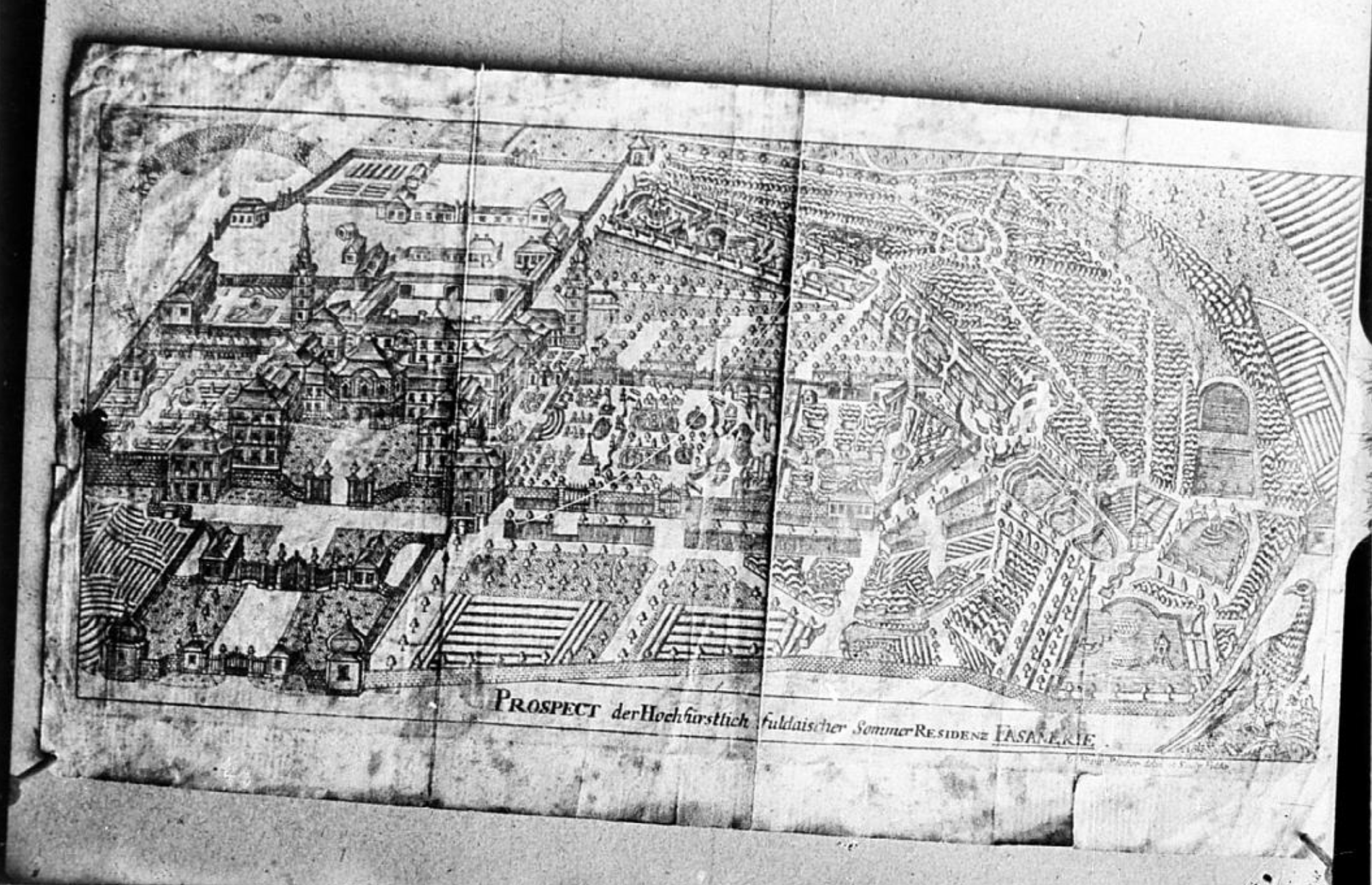
Fasanerie palace and its baroque gardens

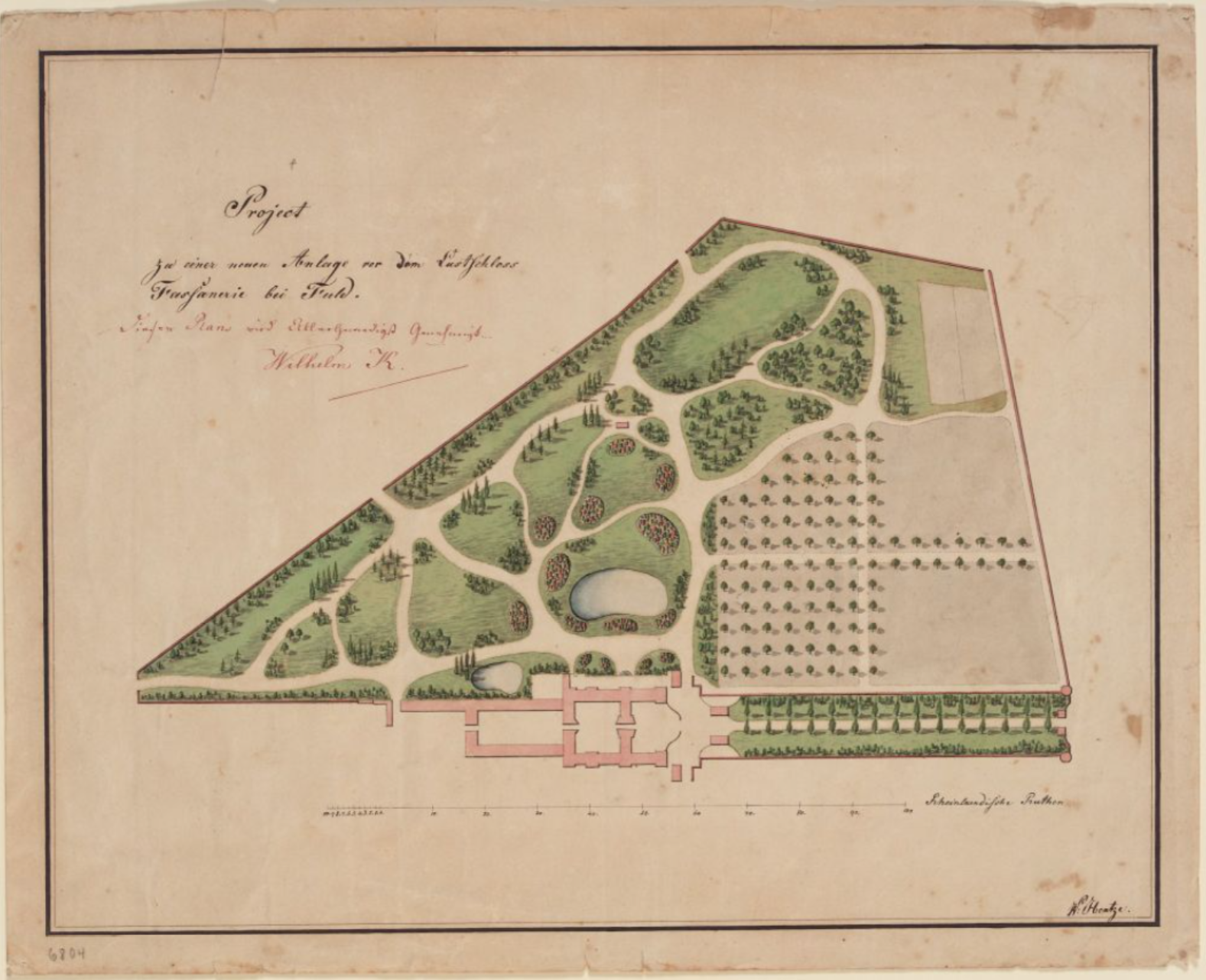
1822 garden design by Wilhelm Hentze

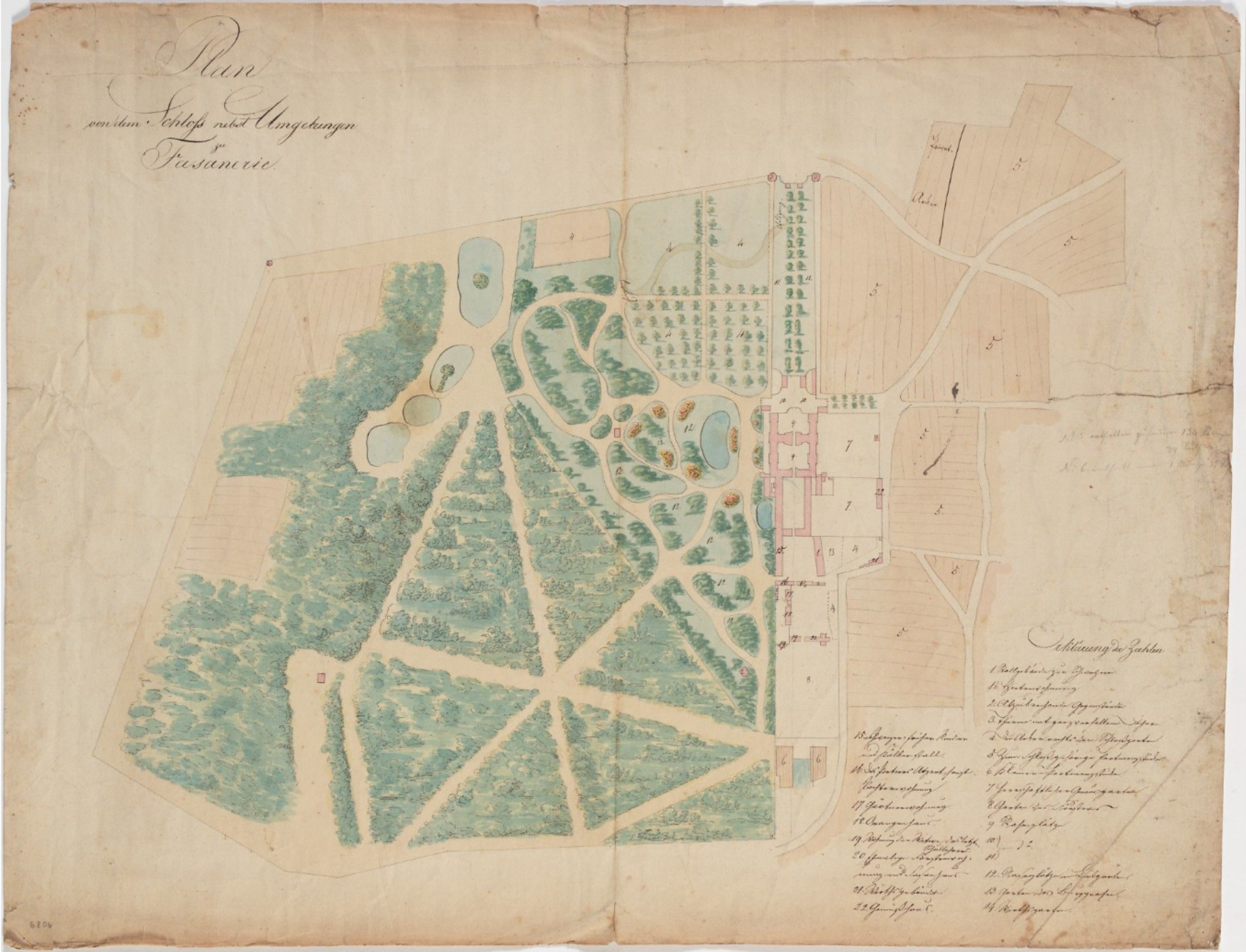
1823 garden plan

== Literature ==
The Palace and Museum

- Susanne Bohl: Paradies im Grünen – Schloss Fasanerie. In: Susanne Bohl und andere (Hrsg.): Fulda. 50 Schätze und Besonderheiten. Michael Imhof Verlag, Petersberg 2016, ISBN 978-3-7319-0425-0, S. 103–107.
- Markus Miller, Andreas Dobler, Christine Klössel: Schloss Fasanerie – Museum und Kunstsammlung des Hauses Hessen. Schenck Verlag, Hamburg 2012, ISBN 978-3-9807134-9-8.
- Rolf Müller (Hrsg.): Schlösser, Burgen, alte Mauern. Hessendienst der Staatskanzlei, Wiesbaden 1990, ISBN 3-89214-017-0, S. 94–96.
- Meinolf Siemer, Kornelia Wagner: Museum Schloss Fasanerie bei Fulda. Westermann, Braunschweig 1988.

The palace gardens

- Silke Altena, Wolfgang Wette: Parkanlagen Schloss Fasanerie / Fulda. In: Die Gartenkunst 25 (2/2013), Wernersche Verlagsgesellschaft, Worms 2013, ISSN 0935-0519, S. 341–354.
- Martin Engel: Ein floristisches und faunistisches Portrait der Parkanlagen (Schloss und Wildpark) von Schloss Fasanerie bei Eichenzell Kreis Fulda. (= Beiträge zur Naturkunde in Osthessen. Band 50). Michael Imhof Verlag, Petersberg 2013, ISSN 0342-5452, S. 6–192.

Exhibition catalogues (in chronological order)

- Andreas Dobler u. a.: Die Mitgift einer Zarentochter – Meisterwerke russischer Kunst des Historismus aus dem Besitz der Hessischen Hausstiftung Museum Schloß Fasanerie. Edition Minerva, Eurasburg 1997, ISBN 3-932353-08-0.
- Markus Miller, Andreas Dobler, Christine Klössel: Königliches Porzellan aus Frankreich – Sammlerstücke und Service der Manufaktur Vincennes/Sèvres. Museum Schloss Fasanerie, Eichenzell bei Fulda 1999.
- Andreas Dobler u. a.: Interieurs der Biedermeierzeit – Zimmeraquarelle aus fürstlichen Schlössern im Besitz des Hauses Hessen. Michael Imhof Verlag, Petersberg 2004, ISBN 978-3-937251-69-1.
- Markus Miller, Andreas Dobler: Gehäuse der Zeit – Uhren aus fünf Jahrhunderten im Besitz der Hessischen Hausstiftung. Michael Imhof Verlag, Petersberg 2002, ISBN 978-3-935590-35-8.
- Ralf von den Hoff, Andreas Dobler (Hrsg.): Antike – Glanzpunkte der Sammlung griechischer und römischer Kunst aus dem Hause Hessen. Museum Schloss Fasanerie, Eichenzell bei Fulda 2005, ISBN 978-3-9807134-2-9.
- Markus Miller, Andreas Dobler, Christine Klössel: „... im Interesse der Allgemeinheit ergänzen“ – Neuerwerbungen der Hessischen Hausstiftung in 25 Jahren (1981–2006). Museum Schloss Fasanerie, Eichenzell bei Fulda 2006, ISBN 978-3-9807134-4-3.
- Markus Miller, Andreas Dobler, Hildegard Wiewelhove: Die Darmstädter Silberkammer – Werke alter Edelschmiedekunst. Michael Imhof Verlag, Petersberg 2007, ISBN 978-3-86568-290-1.
- Markus Miller, Andreas Dobler, Christine Klössel: Prinz Heinrich von Hessen – Enrico d'Assia (1927–1999), Maler und Sammler. Museum Schloss Fasanerie, Eichenzell bei Fulda 2009, ISBN 978-3-9807134-7-4.
- Markus Miller, Andreas Dobler, Christine Klössel, Mikael Bøgh Rasmussen: Fürstenkinder – Porträts vom 16. bis 20. Jahrhundert im Hause Hessen. Michael Imhof Verlag, Petersberg 2009, ISBN 978-3-86568-383-0.
- Markus Miller, Andreas Dobler: Gedeckte Tafeln im Schloss Fasanerie. Michael Imhof Verlag, Petersberg 2010, ISBN 978-3-9807134-8-1.
- Markus Miller, Andreas Dobler: Orden auf königlichem Porzellan – Das Tafelservice vom Eisernen Helm und die Feldherrenporzellane der Königlichen Porzellanmanufaktur Berlin. Michael Imhof Verlag, Petersberg 2013, ISBN 978-3-86568-977-1.
- Markus Miller, Andreas Dobler u. a.: Höfische Jagd in Hessen – Ereignis, Privileg, Vergnügen. Michael Imhof Verlag, Petersberg 2017, ISBN 978-3-7319-0571-4.
