= Eichenzell =

- Municipality
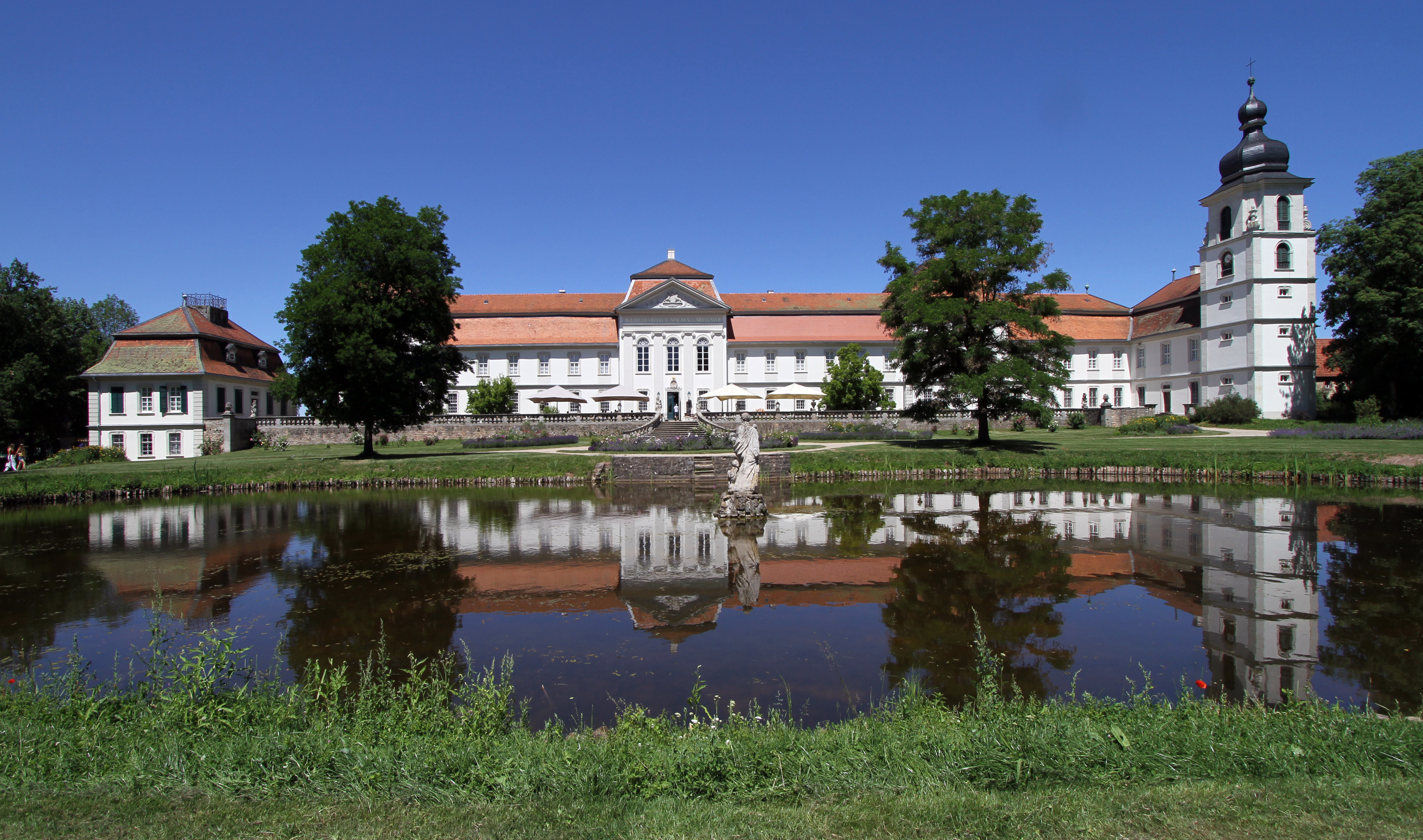
- Fasanerie Palace in Eichenzell

- Coat of arms

- Location of Eichenzell within Fulda district
- Interactive map of Eichenzell
- Location within Germany Location within Hesse
- Coordinates: 50°29′N 09°42′E
- Country: Germany
- State: Hesse
- Admin. region: Kassel
- District: Fulda

Government
  - Mayor (2020–26): Johannes Rothmund (CDU)

Area
  - Total: 55.96 km^{2} (21.61 sq mi)
- Elevation: 314 m (1,030 ft)

Population (2025-12-31)
  - Total: 11,859
  - Density: 211.9/km^{2} (548.9/sq mi)
- Time zone: UTC+01:00 (CET)
  - Summer (DST): UTC+02:00 (CEST)
- Postal codes: 36124
- Dialling codes: 06659
- Vehicle registration: FD
- Website: www.eichenzell.de

Eichenzell is a municipality in the district of Fulda, in Hesse, Germany. It is situated on the river Fulda, 7 km south of the town Fulda.

The letter-processing center for Deutsche Post in the greater Fulda area is in Eichenzell. Die Rhöner Säuwäntzt, a Skiffle-Bluesband, come from Eichenzell-Lütter and use the hillbilly image of the region in their performances.
