= Jan Styrna =

Polish Roman Catholic prelate (1941–2022)

His Excellency Jan Styrna
- Bishop Emeritus of Elbląg
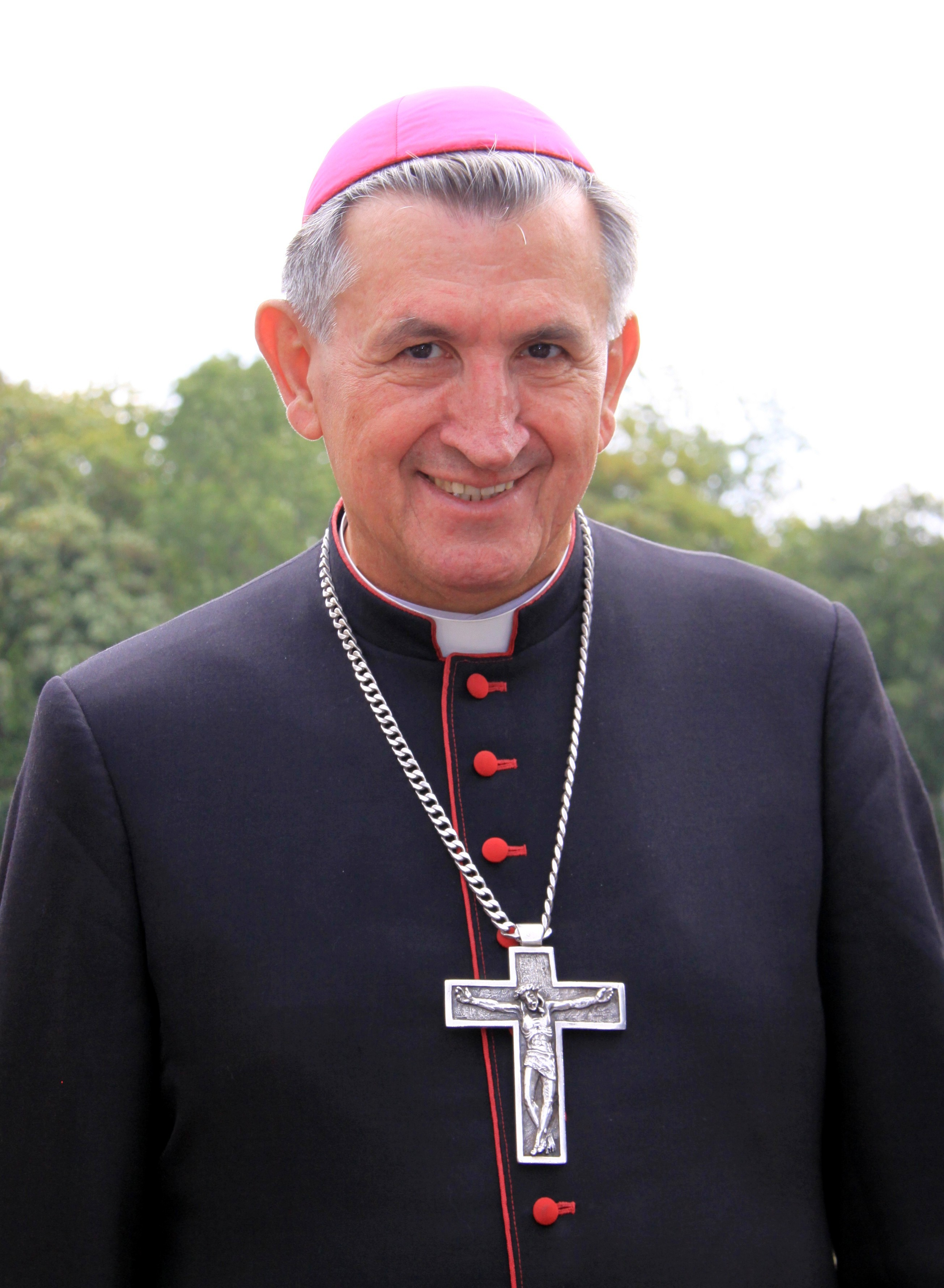
- Archdiocese: Warmia
- Appointed: 2 August 2003
- Term ended: 10 May 2014
- Predecessor: Andrzej Józef Sliwinski
- Successor: Jacek Jezierski
- Previous posts: Auxiliary Bishop of Tarnów and Titular Bishop of Aquipendium (1991–2003)

Orders
- Ordination: 27 June 1965 by Jerzy Karol Ablewicz
- Consecration: 28 July 1991 by Józef Mirosław Życiński

Personal details
- Born: 25 January 1941 Przyborów, General Government
- Died: 28 September 2022 (aged 81) Elbląg, Poland

Jan Styrna (25 January 1941 – 28 September 2022) was a Polish Roman Catholic prelate.

Styrna was born in Poland and was ordained to the priesthood in 1965. He served as titular bishop of Aquipendium and as auxiliary bishop of the Roman Catholic Diocese of Tarnów, Poland, from 1991 to 2001 and as the bishop of the Roman Catholic Diocese of Elblag, Poland, from 2003 until his resignation in 2013.

Catholic Church titles
Preceded by Andrzej Józef Sliwinski	Bishop of Elbląg; 2003–2014	Succeeded by Jacek Jezierski
Preceded by Post created	Titular Bishop of Aquipendium; 1991–2003	Succeeded by Renato Boccardo
Preceded by —	Auxiliary Bishop of Tarnów; 1991–2003	Succeeded by —
