= Werblinia =

- Village
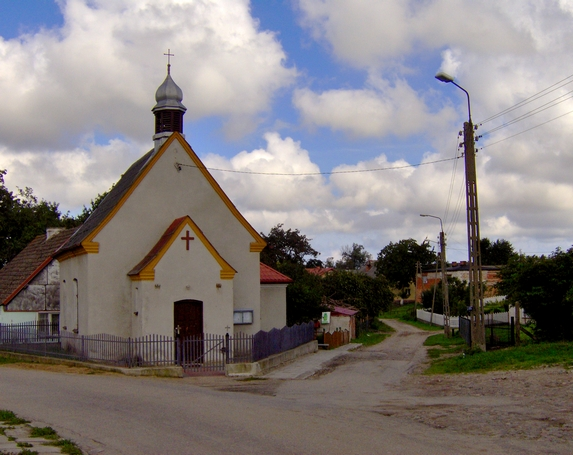
- Church

- Location within Poland
- Coordinates: 54°44′39″N 18°18′2″E
- Country: Poland
- Voivodeship: Pomeranian
- County: Puck
- Gmina: Puck
- Population: 544

Werblinia ([vɛrˈbliɲa]; German: Werblin) is a village in the administrative district of Gmina Puck, within Puck County, Pomeranian Voivodeship, in northern Poland.

For details of the history of the region, see History of Pomerania.

== Notable residents ==
- Bruno Kant (1916–2026), German Roman Catholic priest and supercentenarian
