= Piaśnica =

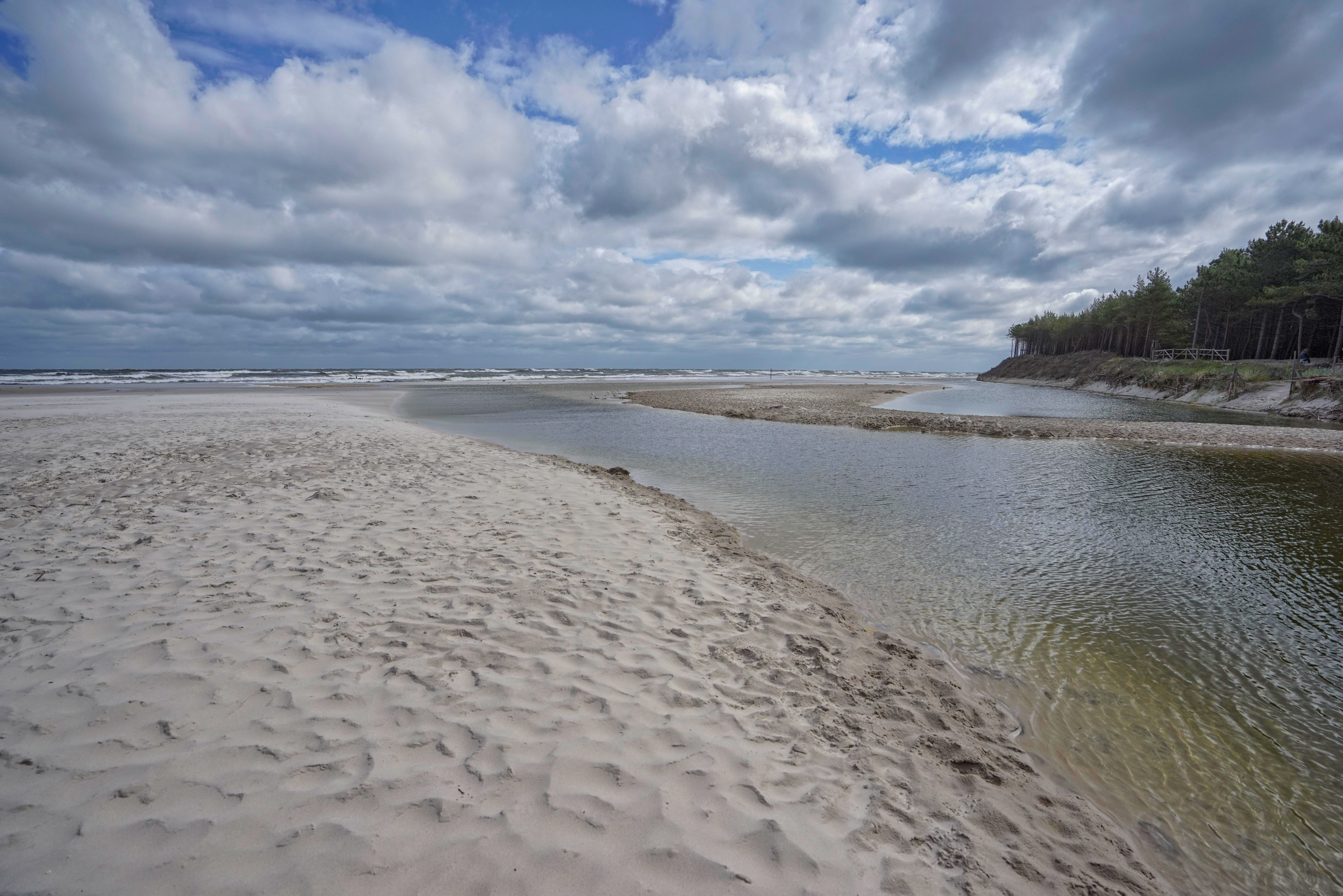
- Piaśnica estuary

Location
- Country: Poland

Physical characteristics
- Mouth
  - location: Baltic Sea
  - coordinates: 54°50′01″N 18°03′45″E

The Piaśnica is a river in northern Poland, in Puck County near Gdańsk, in Pomeranian Voivodeship. It begins inside the Puszcza Darżlubska Wilderness, located in the northernmost part of the geographical region of Pobrzeże Kaszubskie. Darżlubie Forest (also referred to in Polish as Lasy Piaśnickie) contains two nature reserves (Polish protected areas). On the south–side it borders the Tricity Landscape Park from which, it is separated by the Reda river. The wilderness, is also the source of river Gizdepka. The name of Piaśnica comes from the nearby villages of Piaśnica Mała and Piaśnica Wielka.

The Piaśnica wilderness, where the river begins, is a place of Polish and Jewish martyrology; the second largest site of mass killings of Polish civilians in Pomerania (after Stutthof) during World War II. The Mass murders in Piaśnica, of about 12,000–16,000 hostages (mostly intelligentsia), were committed by the Nazis between the fall of 1939 and spring of 1940 near the town of Wielka Piaśnica.

The Piaśnica flows through Lake Żarnowiec and terminates into the Baltic Sea near Żarnowiec.

== Notes and references ==
- Rzeka Piaśnica, at www.polwysep.pl (in Polish)
- Kayaking on Piaśnica (in Polish)
- Scuba-diving at Piaśnica (in Polish)
