= Puszcza Darżlubska =

Forest complex in northern Poland

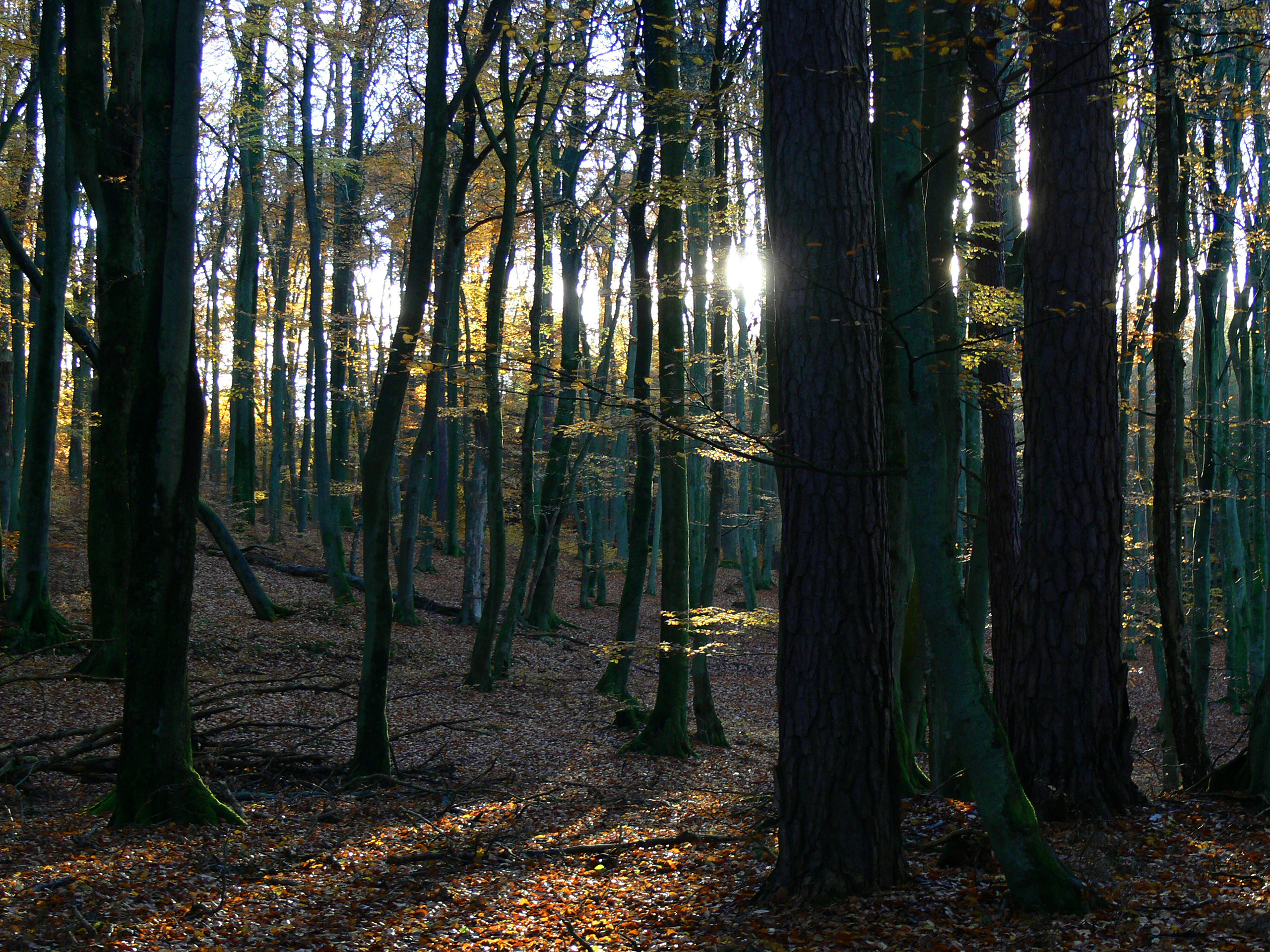
- Nature reserve Darzlubskie Buki

- Location within Poland

Geography
- Location: Pomeranian Voivodeship, Poland
- Coordinates: 54°39′57″N 18°16′15″E

Administration
- Events: Massacres in Piaśnica

Puszcza Darżlubska (pronounced [puʂ'tʂa darʐlubska]) or Lasy Piaśnickie (English: Darżlubska Wilderness or Darżlubie / Piaśnica Forest), located in the northernmost part of Poland, is a Polish forests complex on the Baltic Sea, within the geographical region of Pobrzeże Kaszubskie; on the south-side bordering the Tricity Landscape Park (Trójmiejski Park Krajobrazowy) from which it is separated by the Reda river. Inside Darżlubie Forest there are two nature reserves (Polish protected areas). The wilderness is also the source of two rivers: Piaśnica and Gizdepka. The name of Puszcza Darżlubska comes from the nearby village of Darżlubie in the administrative district of Gmina Puck, north of Gdańsk.

Puszcza Darżlubska is the second largest site of mass killings of Polish civilians in Pomerania (after Stutthof) during World War II, with up to 16,000 victims murdered on the site. Polish migrant worker families residing in Germany pre-war were the largest group executed. Besides Poles and Kashubs, the victims included patients from mental health hospitals (including Germans), Czechs and Jews. The waves of Nazi German executions, known as the Mass murders in Piaśnica, of about 12,000–16,000 victims, were committed between the fall of 1939 and spring of 1940 near the town of Wielka Piaśnica.

With the total area of c.17,271 ha Puszcza Darżlubska includes two protected landscape areas called Darżlubskie Buki and Źródliska Czarnej Wody Nature Reserve. The flora of both is similar to that of the Tricity Landscape Park established in 1979. The dominant tree is European beech (Fagus sylvatica) forming thickets with pine and other coniferous trees.

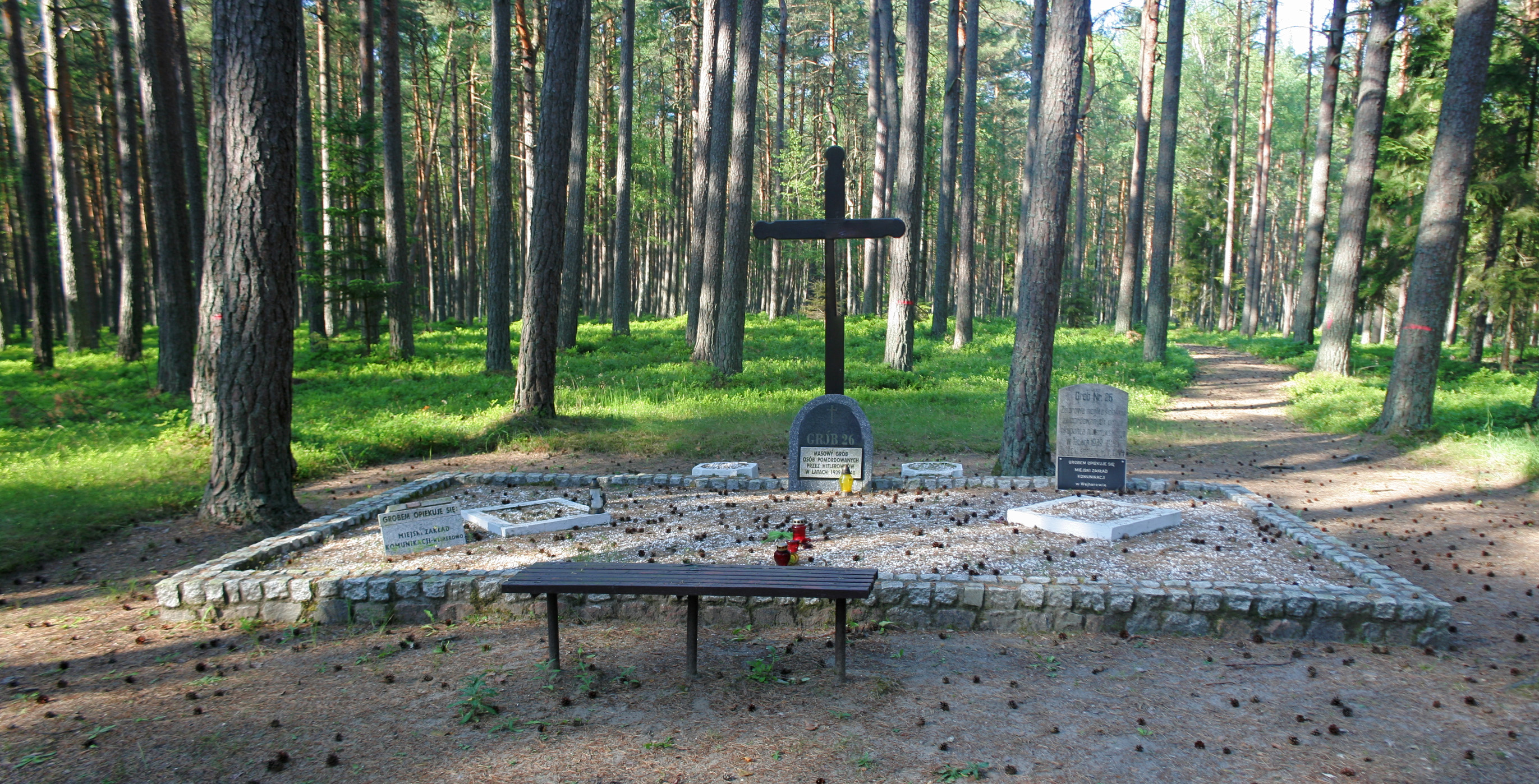
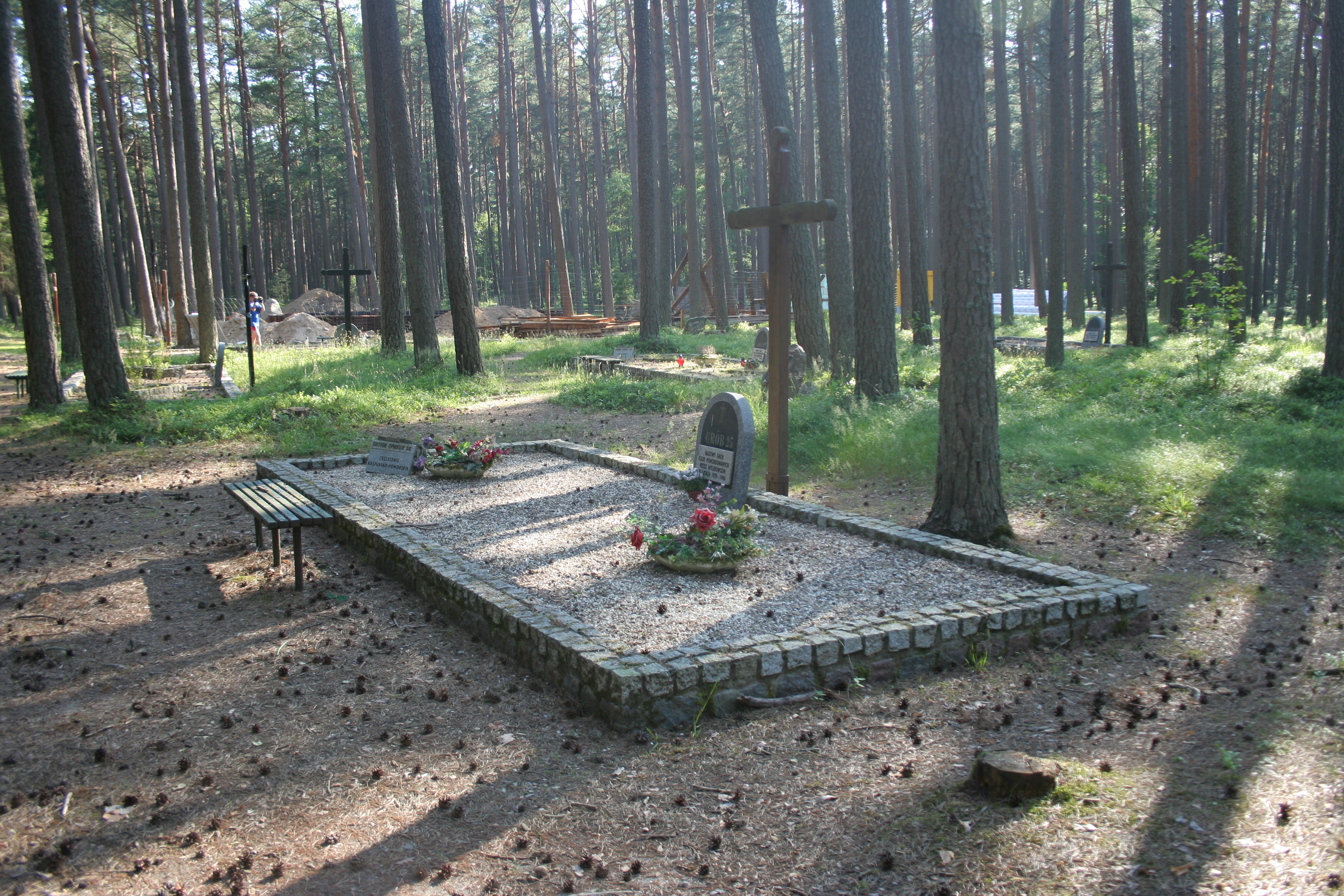
Two among 30 identified mass graves hidden in the woods, from the Nazi German Intelligenzaktion Pommern against civilian Poles living in Pomerania

== Geography ==
The area is covered mainly by coniferous forest in which the dominating tree is beech forming lowland groves. The beach is relatively young in the region. After the retreating glacier and the gradual warming of the climate around c.8,000 BC, the whole area was first covered by tundra. Along with the rise of temperature, the flora of the tundra gave way to new forest ecosystems in which most prominent were birches (Betula), pines (Pinus) and hazel (Corylus). The ecosystem of the primeval forest changed again with additional, warmer (stenothermic) varieties entering the landscape, including aspen (Populus tremula), elm tree (Ulmus), oak (Quercus) and ash tree (Fraxinus).

In spite of the scarcity of tourist trails, Puszcza Darżlubska, is also a good recreational area with many natural, historical and cultural artifacts and various points of interest for the visitors.

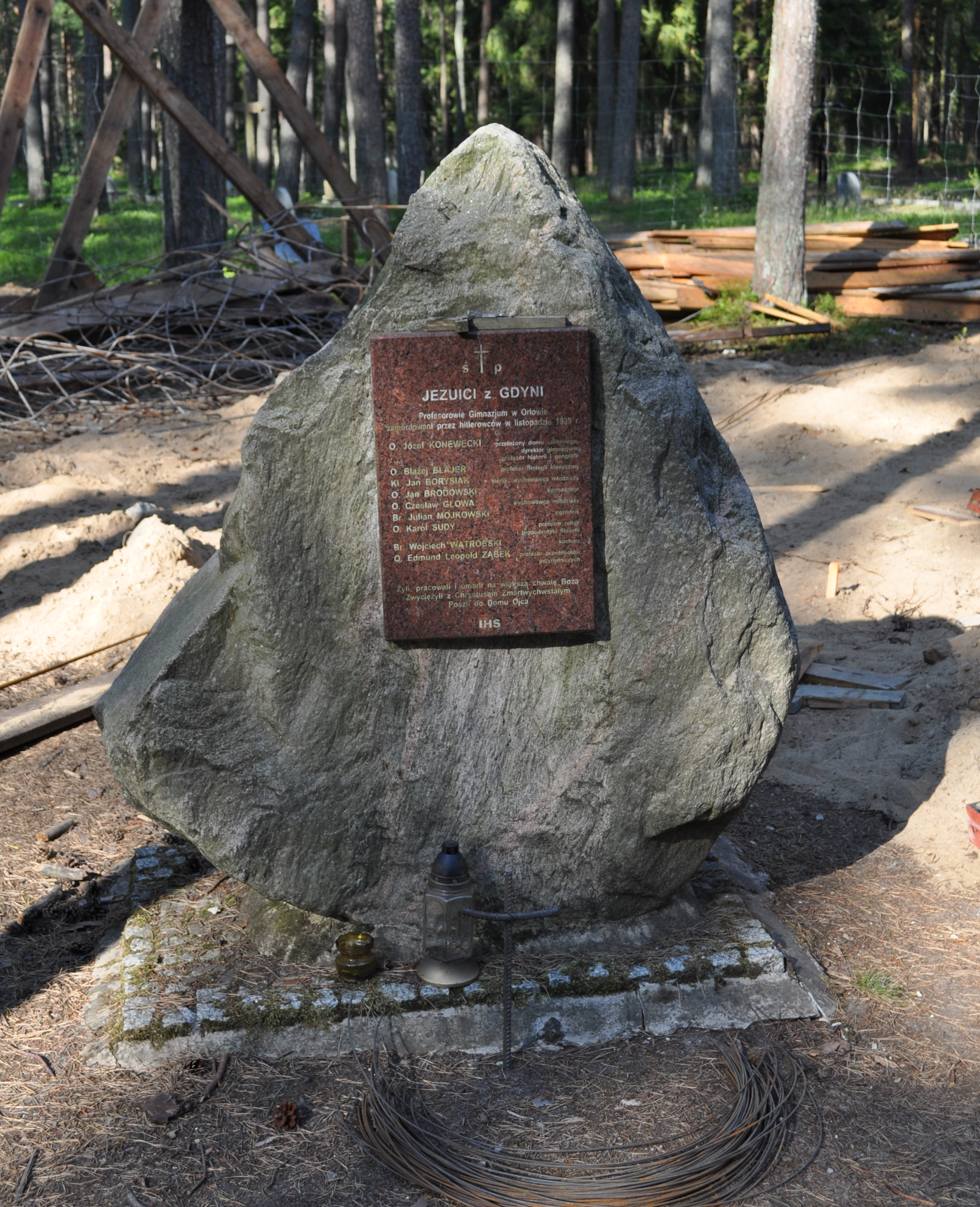
One of many smaller killing sites within the forest

== The killing ground ==
The waves of Nazi German executions, known as the Mass murders in Piaśnica, of about 12,000–16,000 hostages (mostly members of Polish migrant workers families residing in interwar Germany and members of Polish intelligentsia), were committed between the fall of 1939 and spring of 1940 near the town of Wielka Piaśnica. There are various commemoration sites in the forest, at 26 mass graves of victims and elsewhere.

== See also ==
- World War II crimes in Poland
- Wejherowo in Gdańsk Pomerania
