= Gościcina =

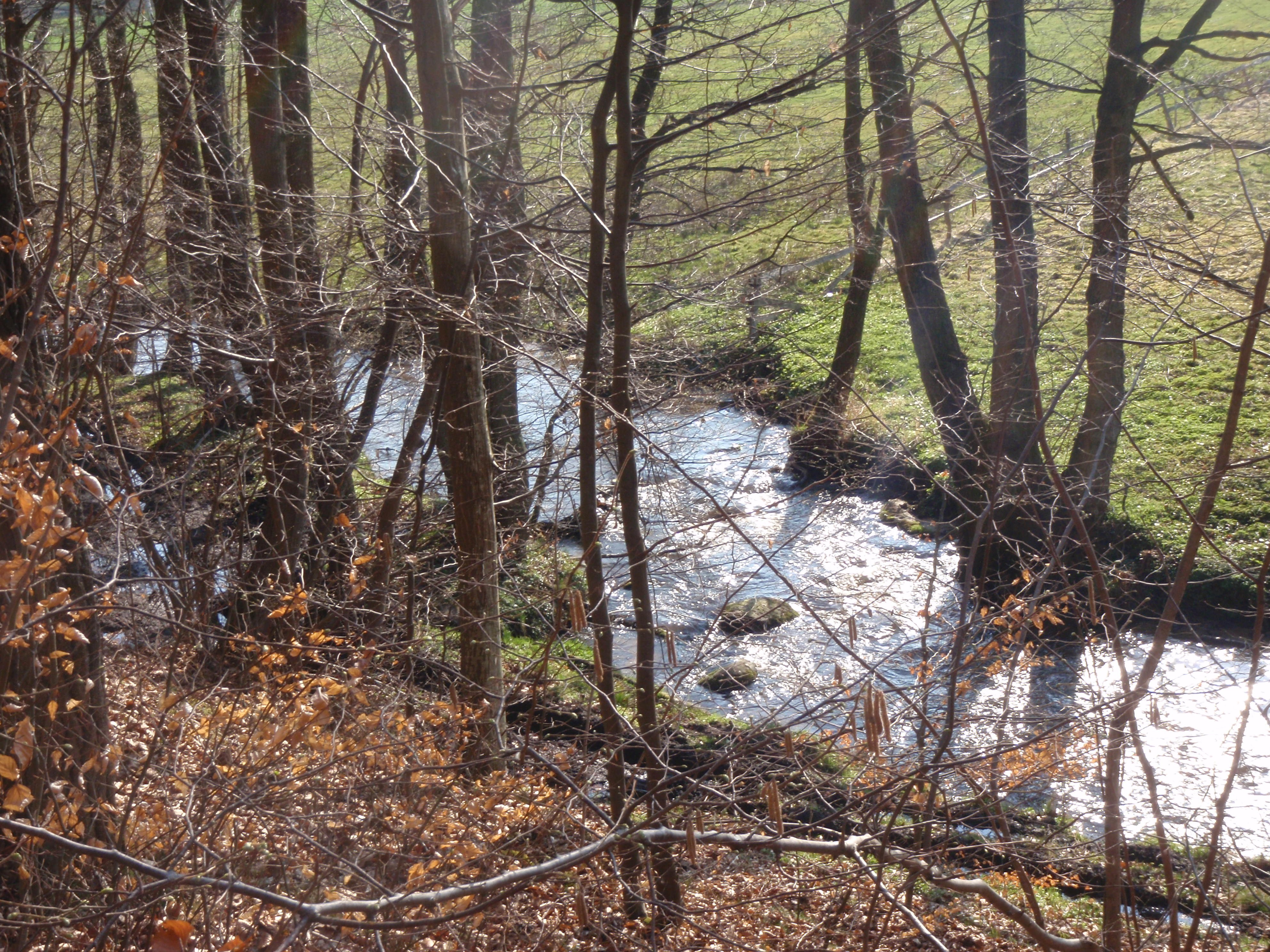

Location
- Country: Poland
- Voivodeship: Pomeranian
- County (Powiat): Wejherowo

Physical characteristics
- Source: Lake Wycztok
  - location: Gmina Szemud
  - coordinates: 54°27′04.0″N 18°14′37.0″E
  - elevation: 194 m (636 ft)
- Mouth: Bolszewka
  - location: Gościcino, Gmina Wejherowo
  - coordinates: 54°36′18″N 18°09′37″E
  - elevation: 33 m (108 ft)
- Length: 33.52 km (20.83 mi)

Basin features
- Progression: Bolszewka→ Reda→ Baltic Sea

Gościcina is a river of Poland, a tributary of the Bolszewka near Wejherowo.
