= Bolszewka =

Location
- Country: Poland

Physical characteristics
- Mouth
  - location: Reda
  - coordinates: 54°37′21″N 18°11′43″E

Basin features
- Progression: Reda→ Baltic Sea

Bolszewka is a river in Poland, a tributary of the Reda near Bolszewo, Pomeranian Voivodeship.

== See also ==
- Gościcina
