= Tricity Landscape Park =

Protected area in northern Poland

- Trójmiejski Park Krajobrazowy
- IUCN category V (protected landscape/seascape)
- Location within Poland
- Location: Pomeranian Voivodeship, Poland
- Nearest city: Tricity
- Coordinates: 54.42153°N 18.54289°E
- Area: 199.3 km^{2} (77.0 sq mi)
- Established: 03-05-1979
- Governing body: Tricity Landscape Park Management
- Website: https://tpkgdansk.pl/

Tricity Landscape Park (Polish: Trójmiejski Park Krajobrazowy; Kashubian: Trzëgardowi Park Krôjòbrôzowi) is a protected area in northern Poland (Polish Landscape Park), established in 1979, and covering the area of 199.3 square kilometres (77.0 sq mi).

The Park lies within the Pomeranian Voivodeship, in Wejherowo County (Gmina Szemud, Gmina Wejherowo). On the north side, the Park extends into the Polish forests complex called Puszcza Darżlubska (Darżlubie Forest or Darżlubska Wilderness), from which it is separated by the Reda river.

Within the Tricity Landscape Park there are 10 nature reserves.

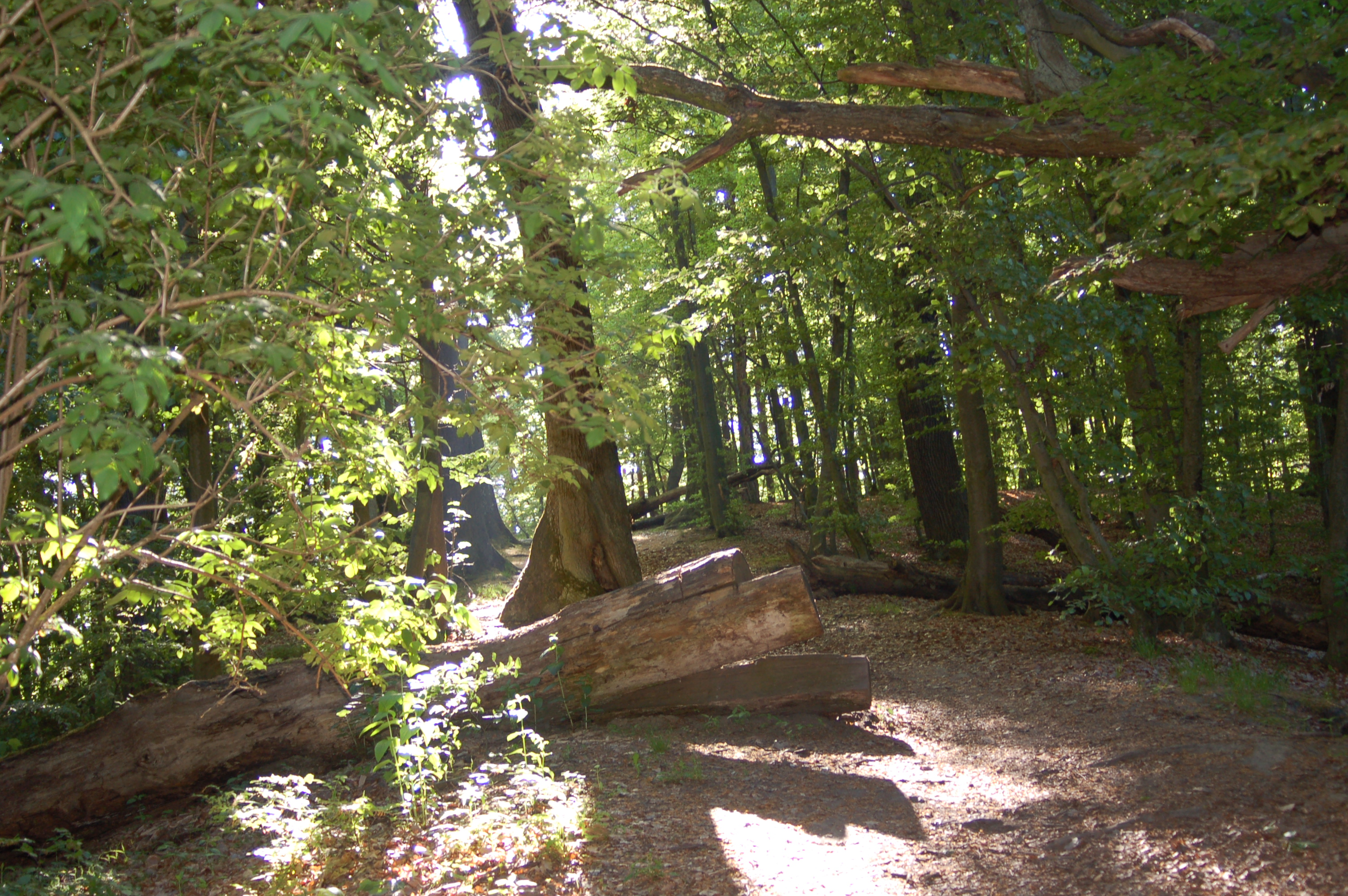
View of the Tricity Landscape Park forested area

== History ==
The Tri-City Landscape Park was established on May 3, 1979 by a Resolution of the Provincial National Council in Gdańsk. According to this resolution, the area of the park was 20,104 ha. The area of the park was changed twice. In 1994 (with effect from 1995), the area was increased to 20,312 ha (including by including forests south of Słowackiego Street, as well as municipal forests) and its buffer zone was designated after 15 years of operation. In 1998, a forest enclave of the village of Łężyce was separated from the area of TPK, which led to a reduction of the area to 19,930 ha.
