= Wielka Piaśnica =

- Village
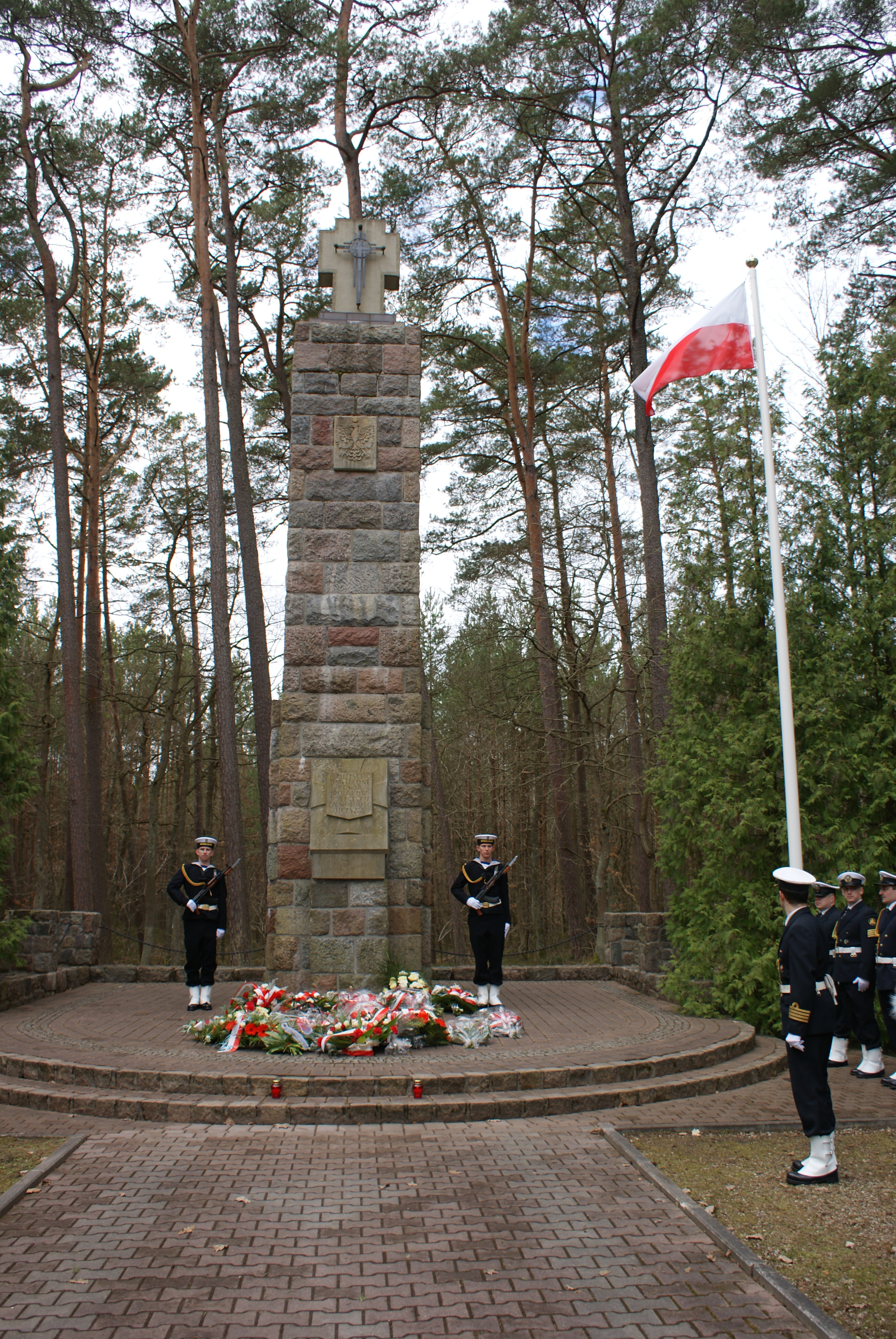
- Memorial outside the village during celebrations

- Location within Poland
- Coordinates: 54°40′56″N 18°11′43″E
- Country: Poland
- Voivodeship: Pomeranian
- County: Puck
- Gmina: Puck

Population
  - Total: 64
- Time zone: UTC+1 (CET)
  - Summer (DST): UTC+2 (CEST)
- Vehicle registration: GPU

Wielka Piaśnica ([ˈvjɛlka pjaɕˈnit͡sa]; German: Groß Piasnitz, 1942–45 Großpesnitz) is a village in the administrative district of Gmina Puck, within Puck County, Pomeranian Voivodeship, in northern Poland.

== History ==
According to the 1921 census, the village had a population of 50, entirely Polish by nationality and Roman Catholic by confession.

=== World War II ===
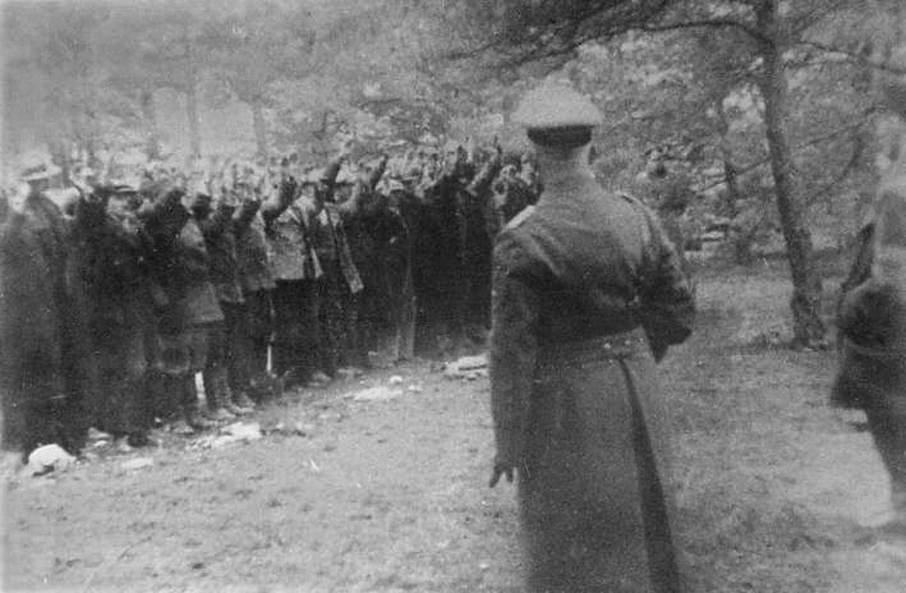
Victims before execution, Massacres in Piaśnica, 1939

After the 1939 Invasion of Poland, German SS from Danzig (Gdańsk) and local German Selbstschutz members executed about 12,000 civilians, mainly Polish and Kashubian intelligentsia from the Pomeranian Voivodeship, in the Darżlubska forest next to the village. Among the victims were approximately 1,200 mentally ill persons from local hospitals, killed in the course of the forced euthanasia policy dubbed Action T4.

The mass executions began in October 1939 and lasted until April 1940. An exhumation of mass graves was carried after World War II in 1946. Out of total number of 35 graves, 30 were localised of which 26 were exhumed. Only 305 bodies (in two mass graves) were found, the rest of the bodies were burnt by Germans in August–September 1944. Sonderkommandos (forced prison labourers) from Stutthof concentration camp were used to cover up the tracks and were later executed.

== See also ==
- Mass murders in Piaśnica
- List of Polish Martyrdom sites
- Anti-Polonism
- Piaśnica (river)
