= Reda (river) =

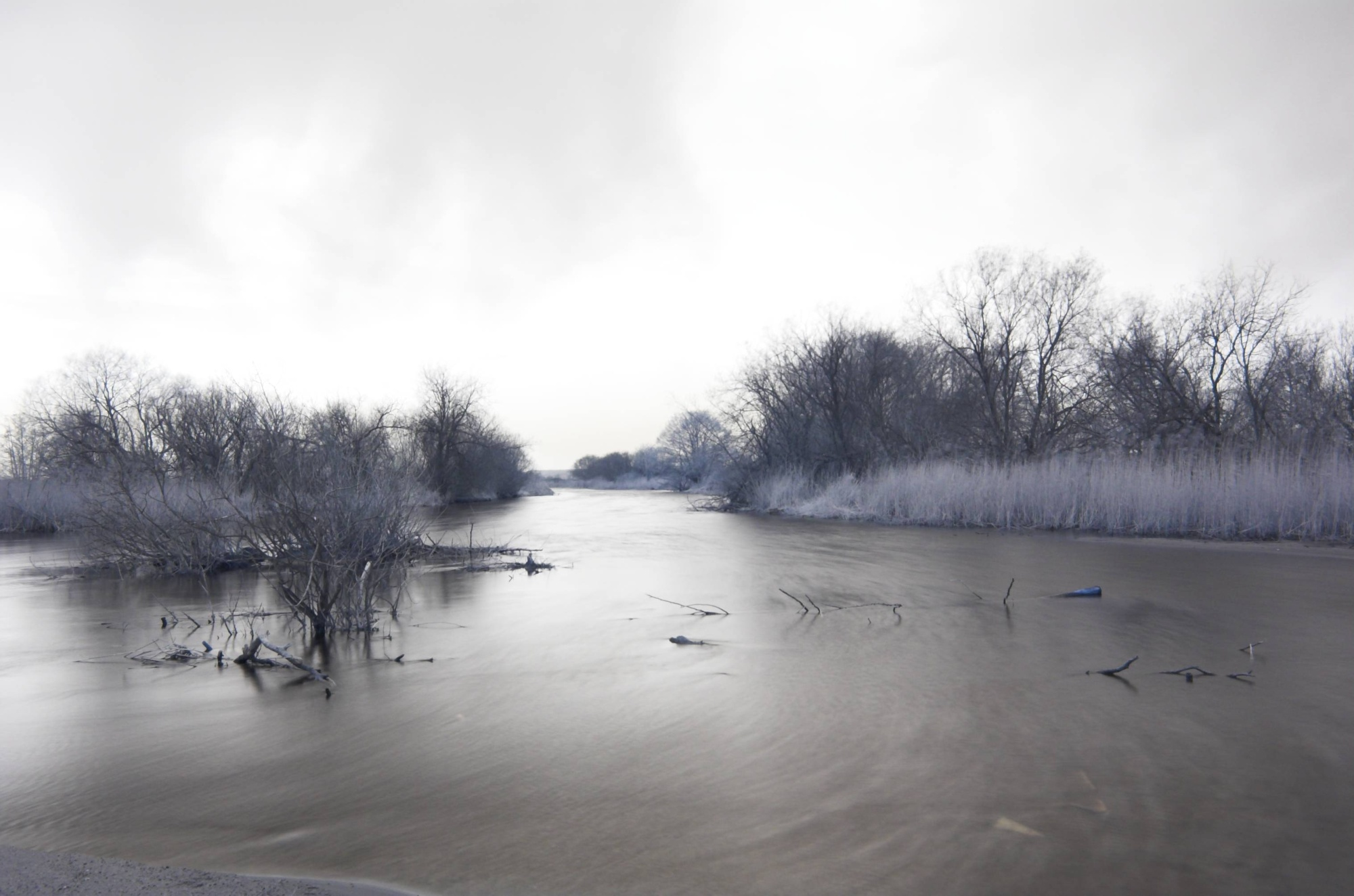
- Reda River and the surrounding landscape

Location
- Country: Poland

Physical characteristics
- Mouth
  - location: Bay of Puck
  - coordinates: 54.6411°N 18.4736°E
- Length: 45 km (28 mi)
- Basin size: 485 km^{2} (187 sq mi)

The Reda is a river in northern Poland in the Pomeranian Voivodship. It empties into the Bay of Puck, a part of Gdańsk Bay.

The Reda is 45 km long, and drains about 485 square kilometers. It flows within the geographical region of Pobrzeże Kaszubskie; bordering Puszcza Darżlubska (English: Darżlubie Forest, or Darżlubska Wilderness) to the north, and the Tricity Landscape Park (Trójmiejski Park Krajobrazowy) to the south.

== Flow of the Reda river ==
The Reda flows through or near these locations:

- Nowy Dwór, Gmina Łęczyce
- Strzebielino
- Kniewo
- Lake Orle
- Orle
- Bolszewo
- Wejherowo
- Reda, Poland

== Gallery ==
The upper course

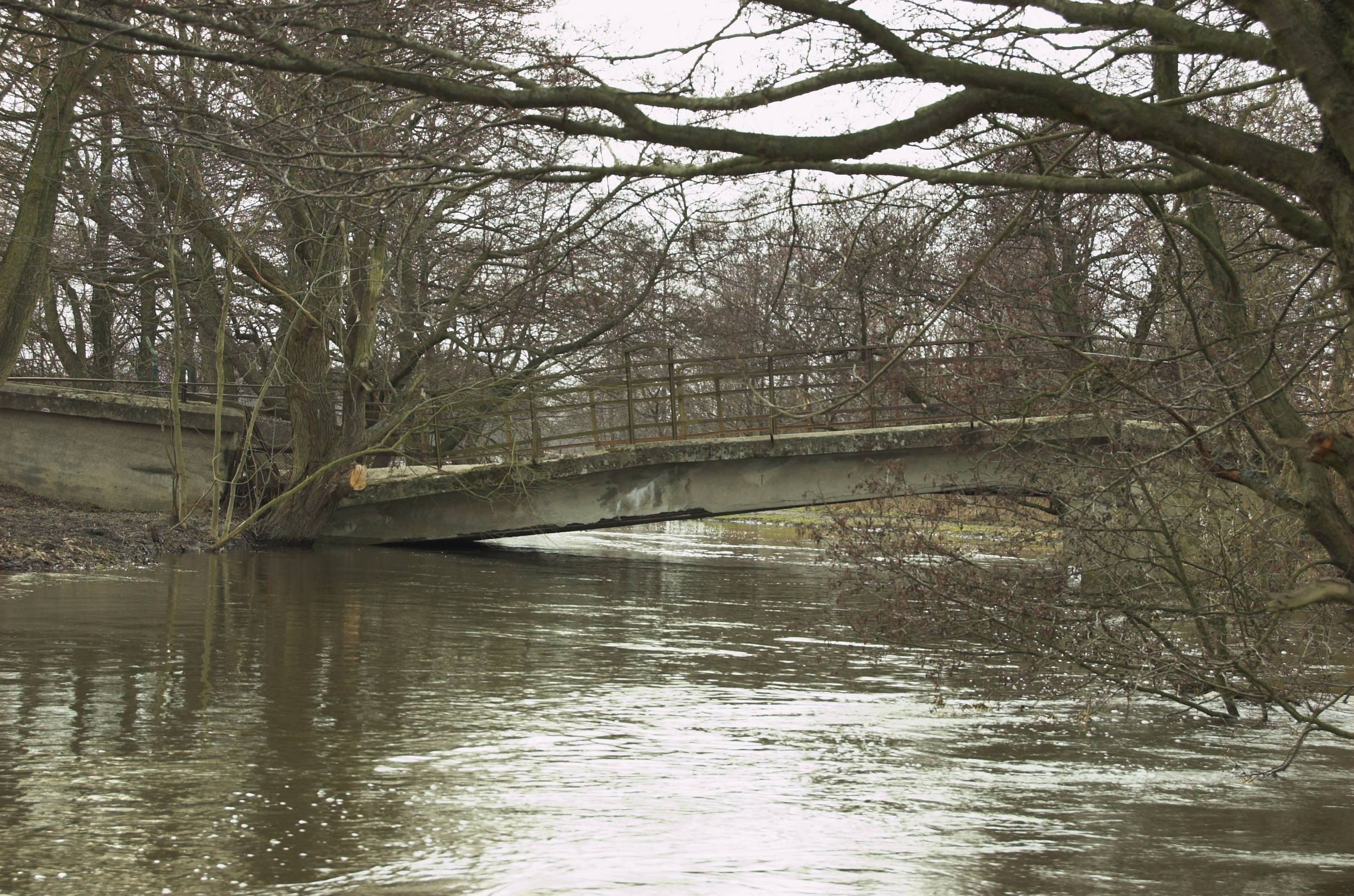
Old bridge

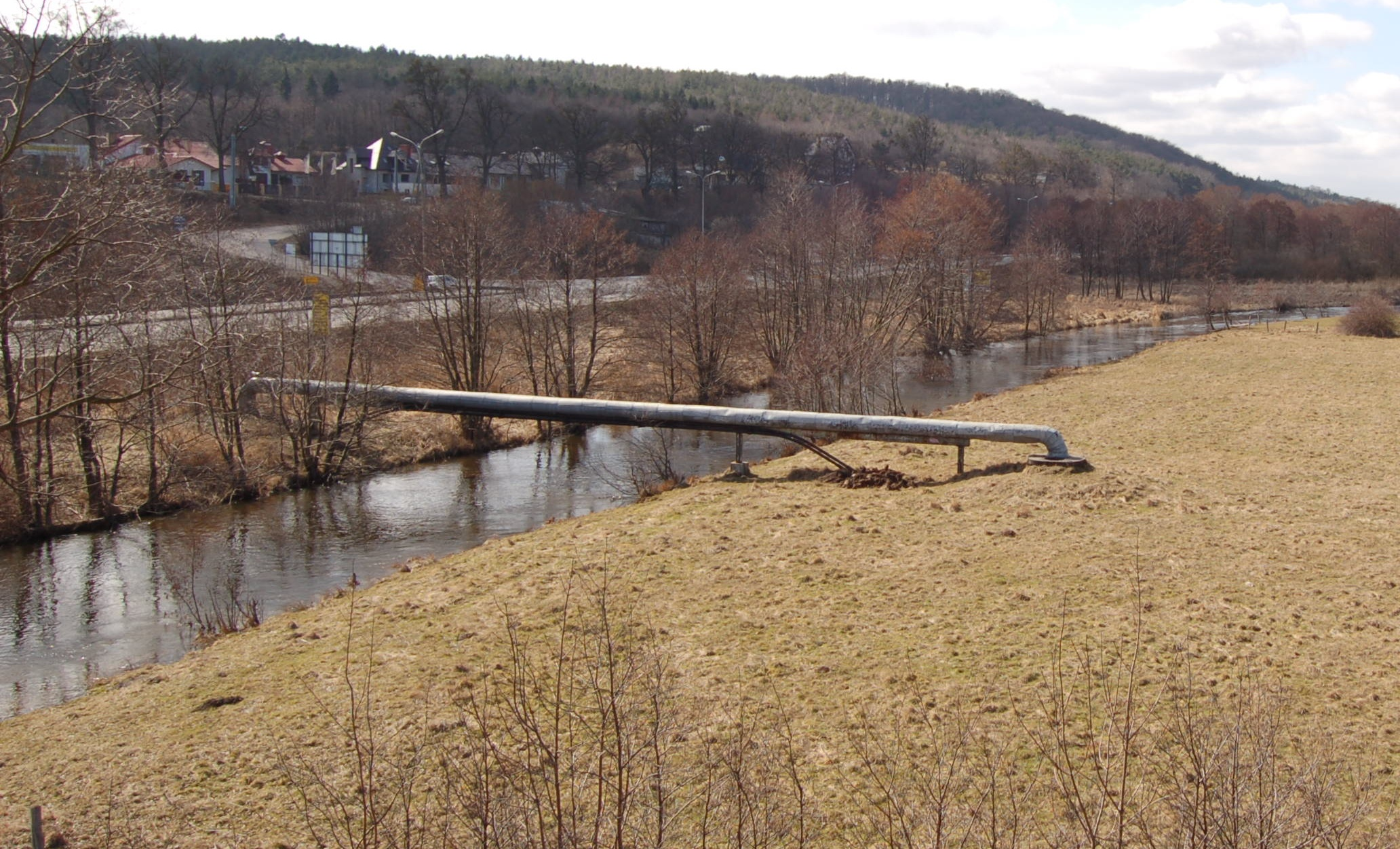
Pipeline

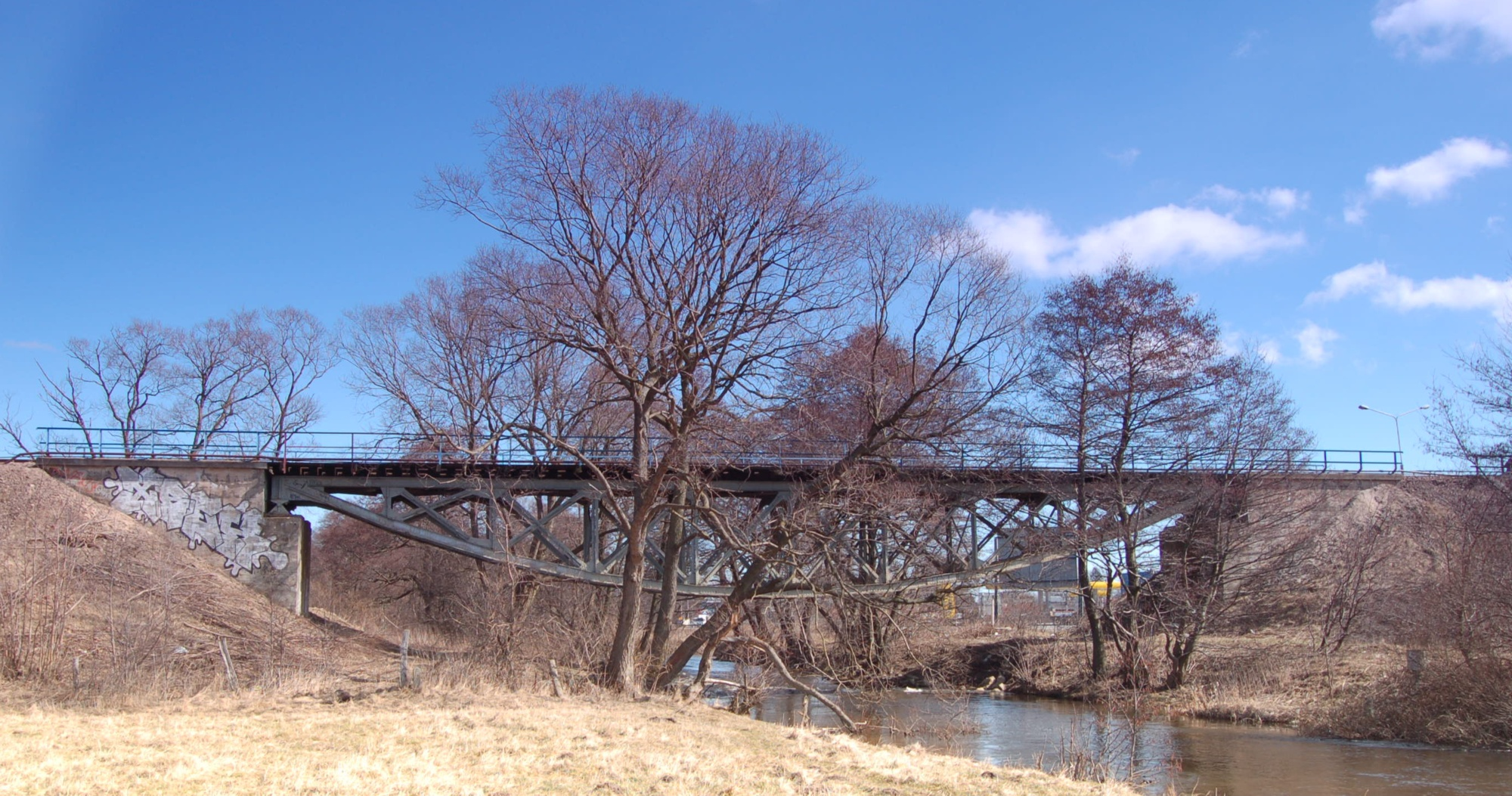
Railway bridge

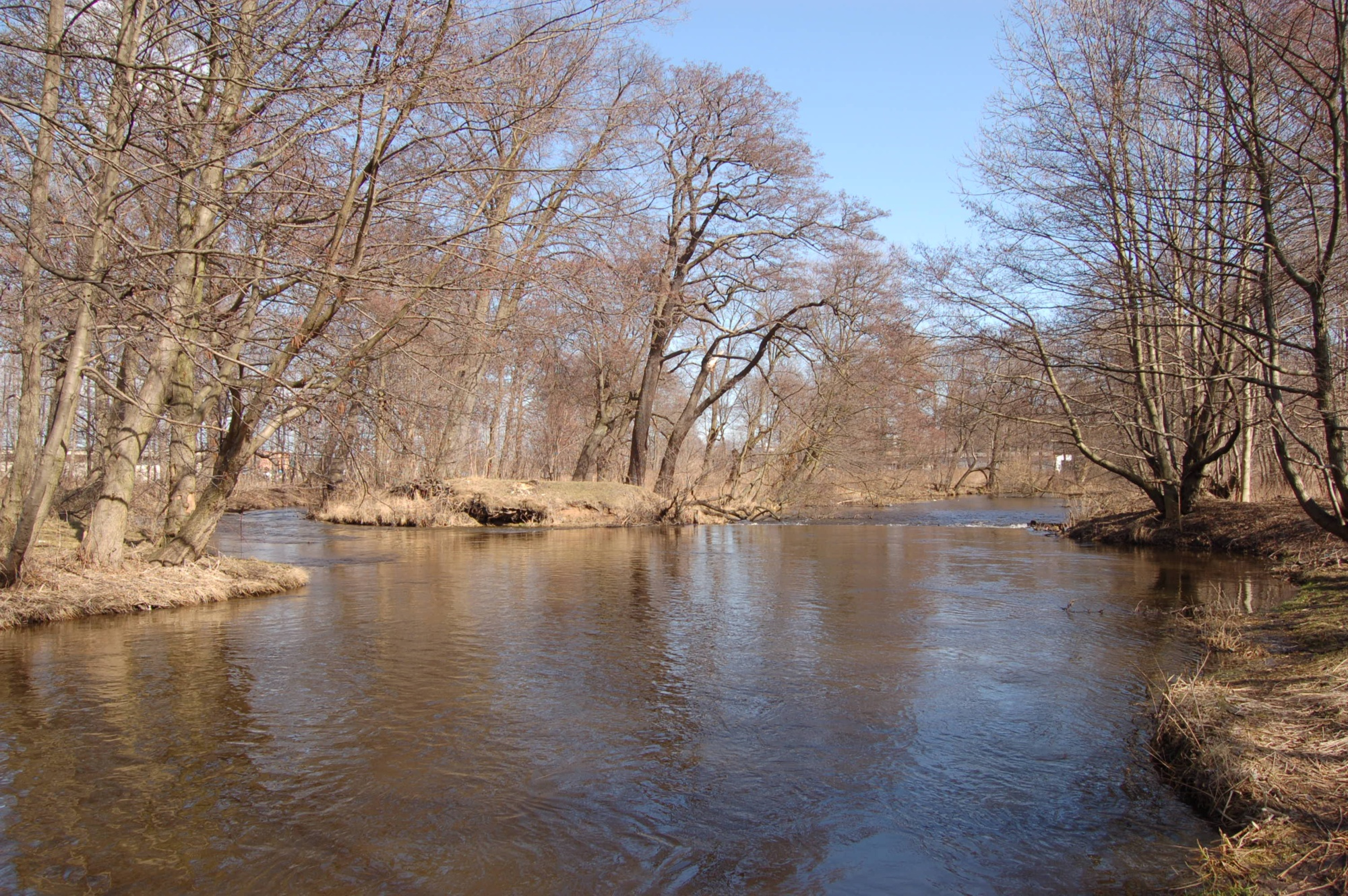
Island on Reda

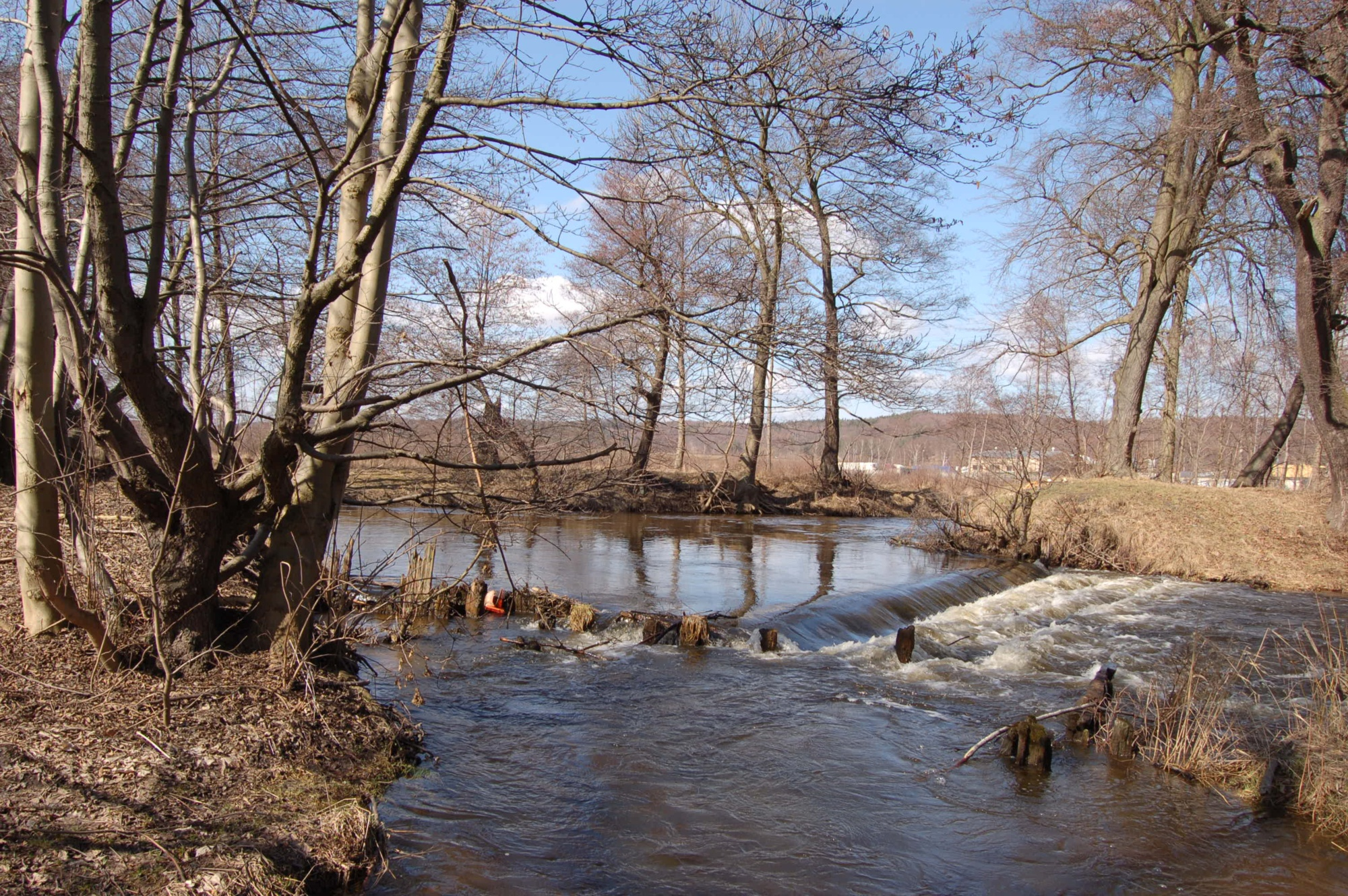
Old sluice gate

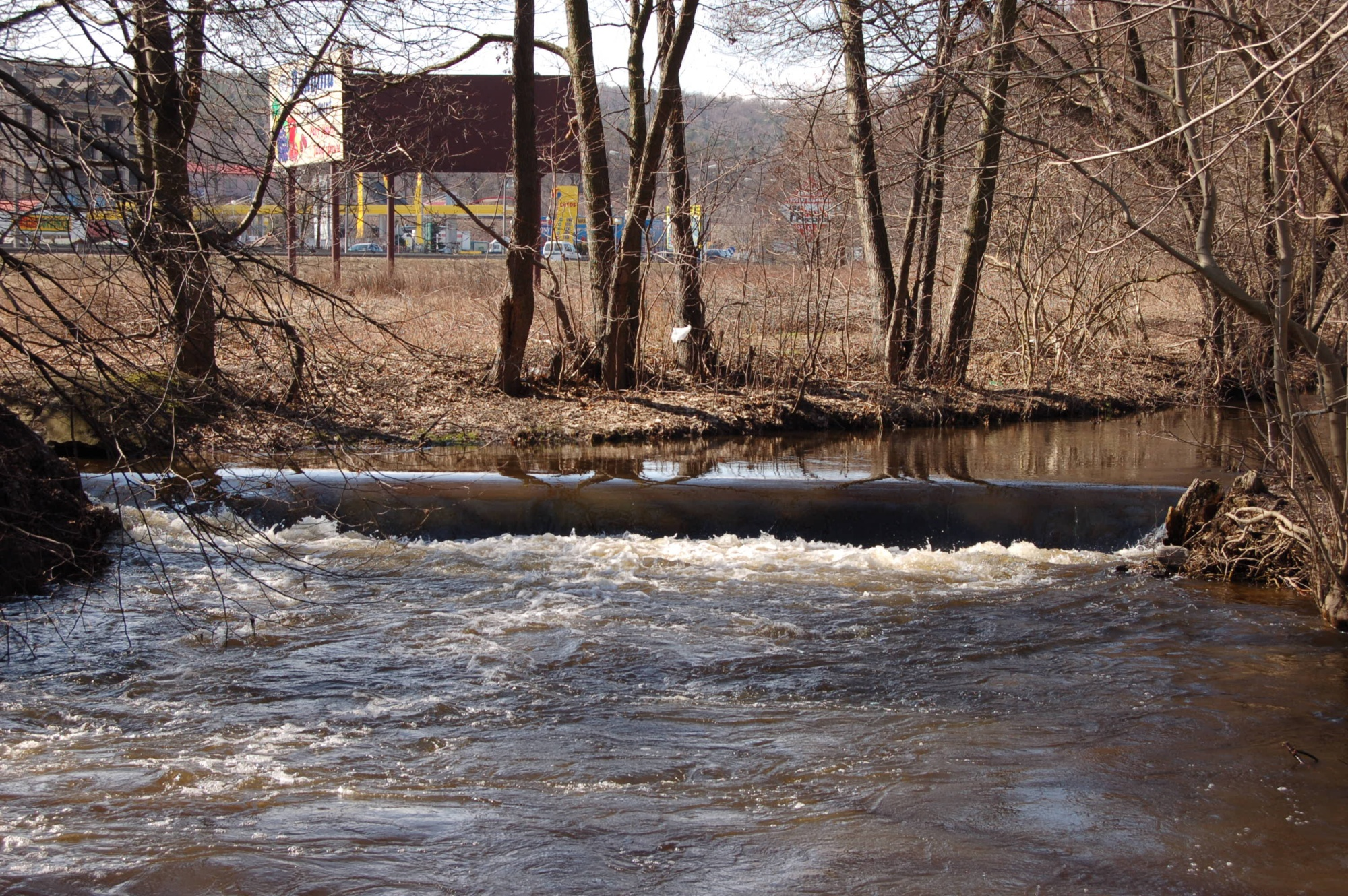
Old footbridge

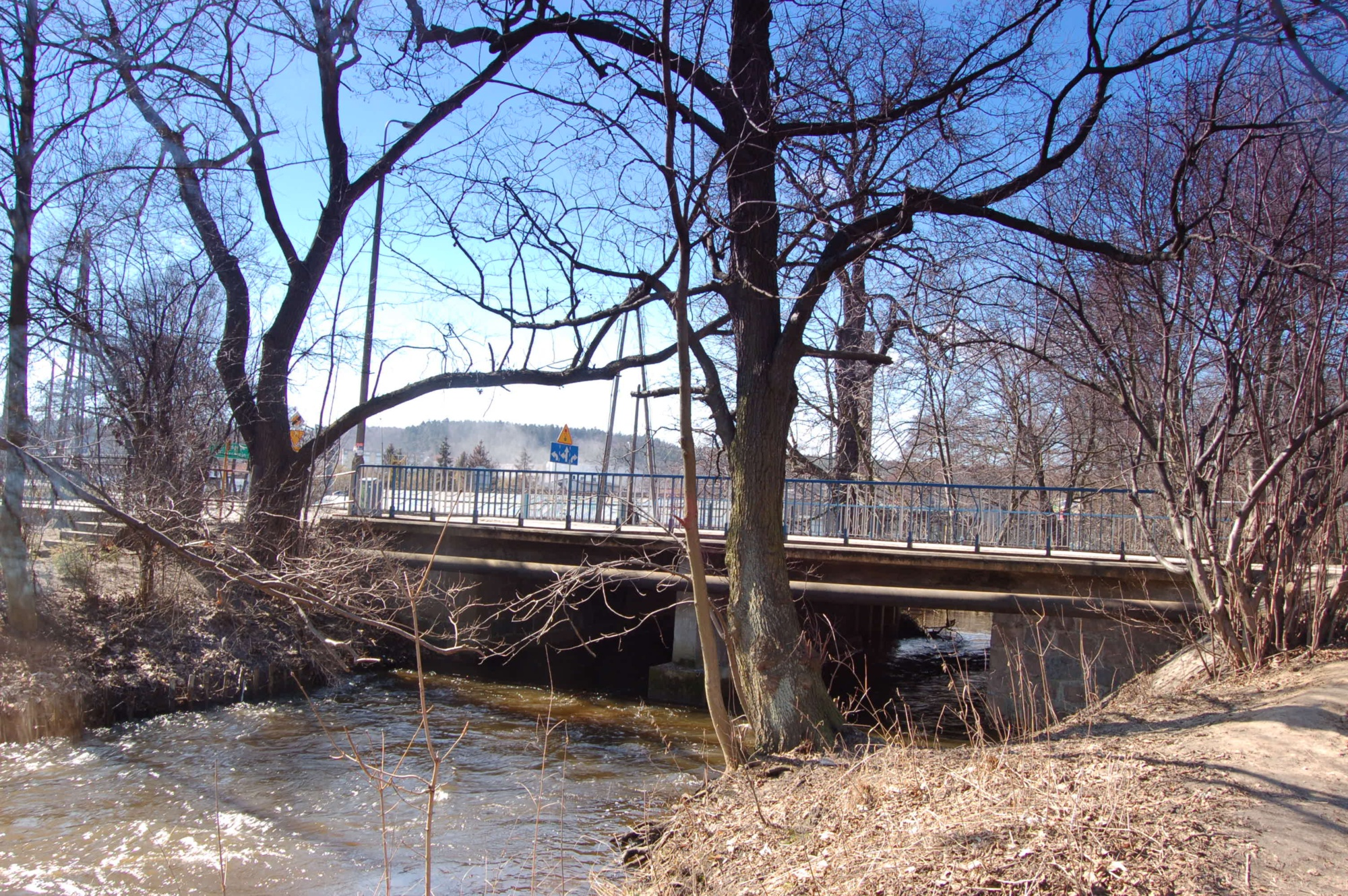
New footbridge

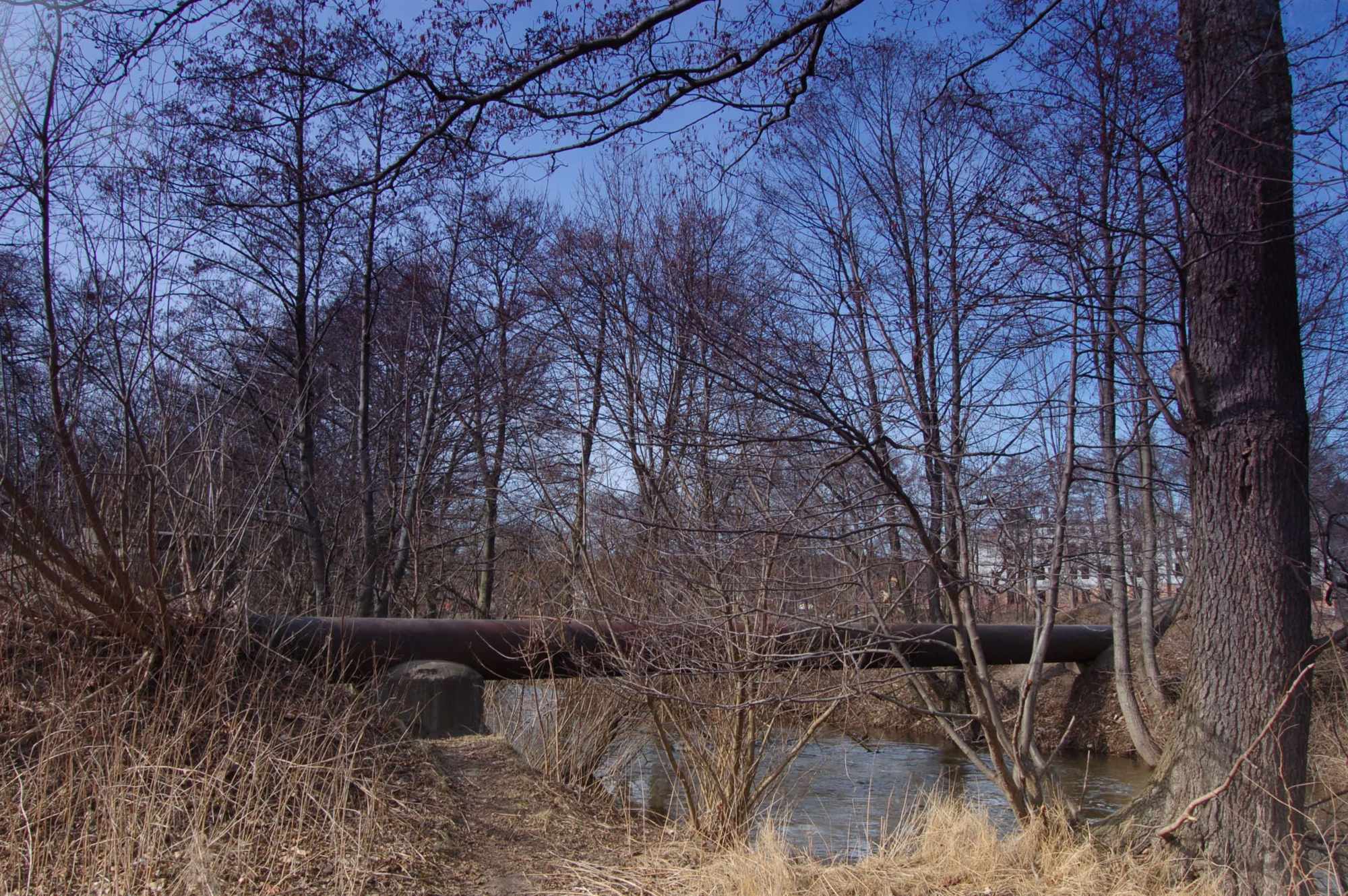
Pipeline bridge

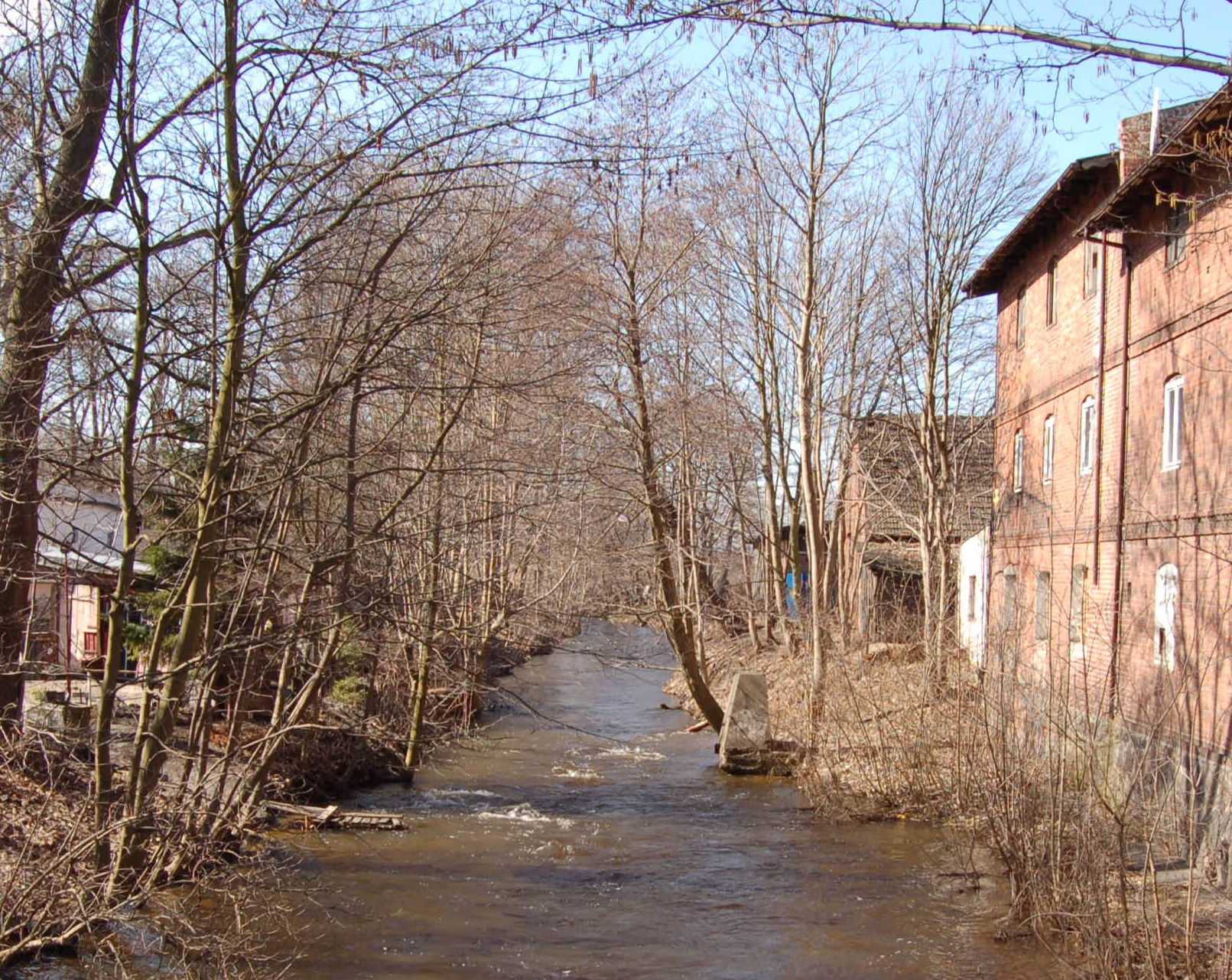
Location of old sluice gate

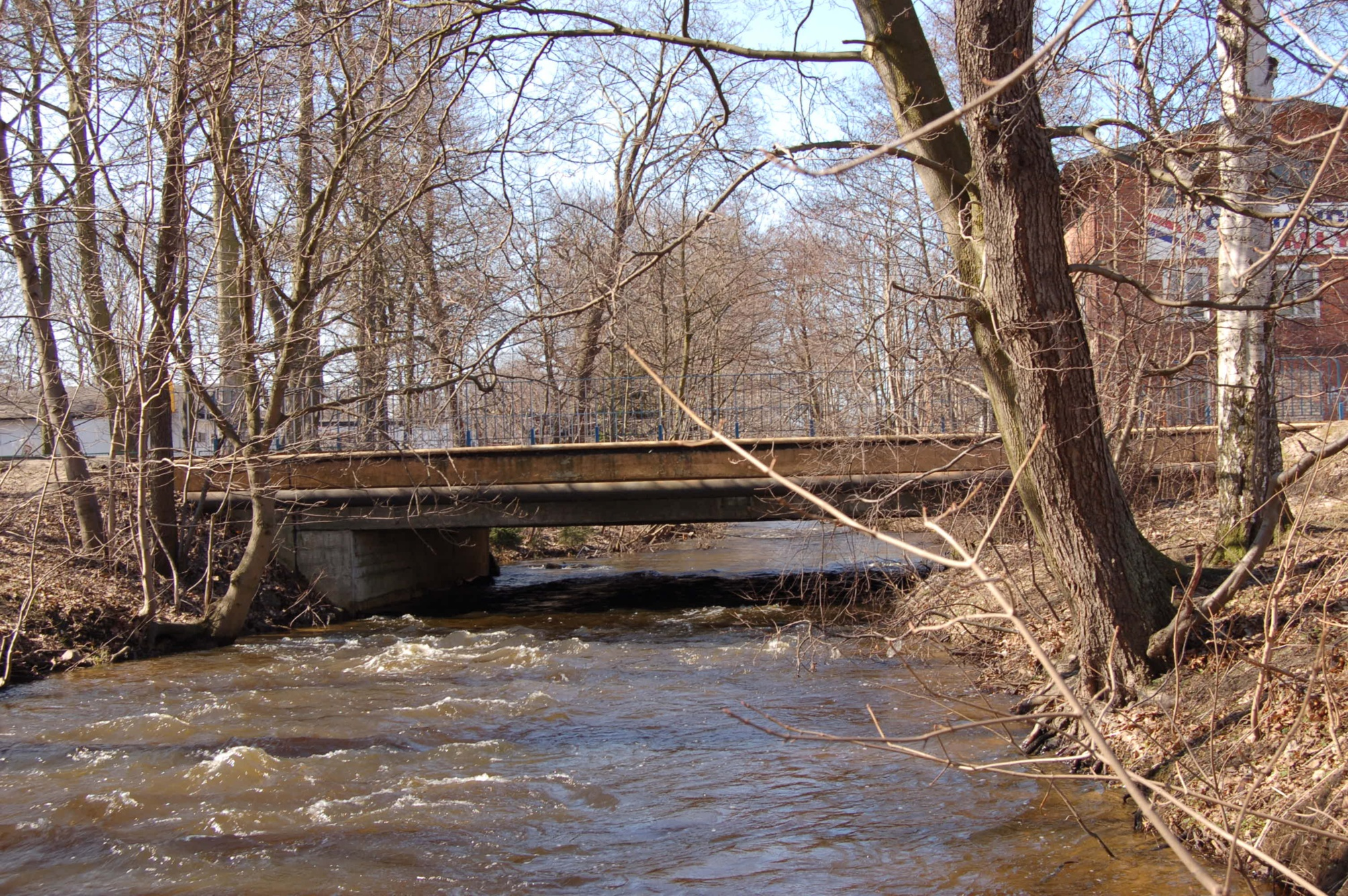
Bridge

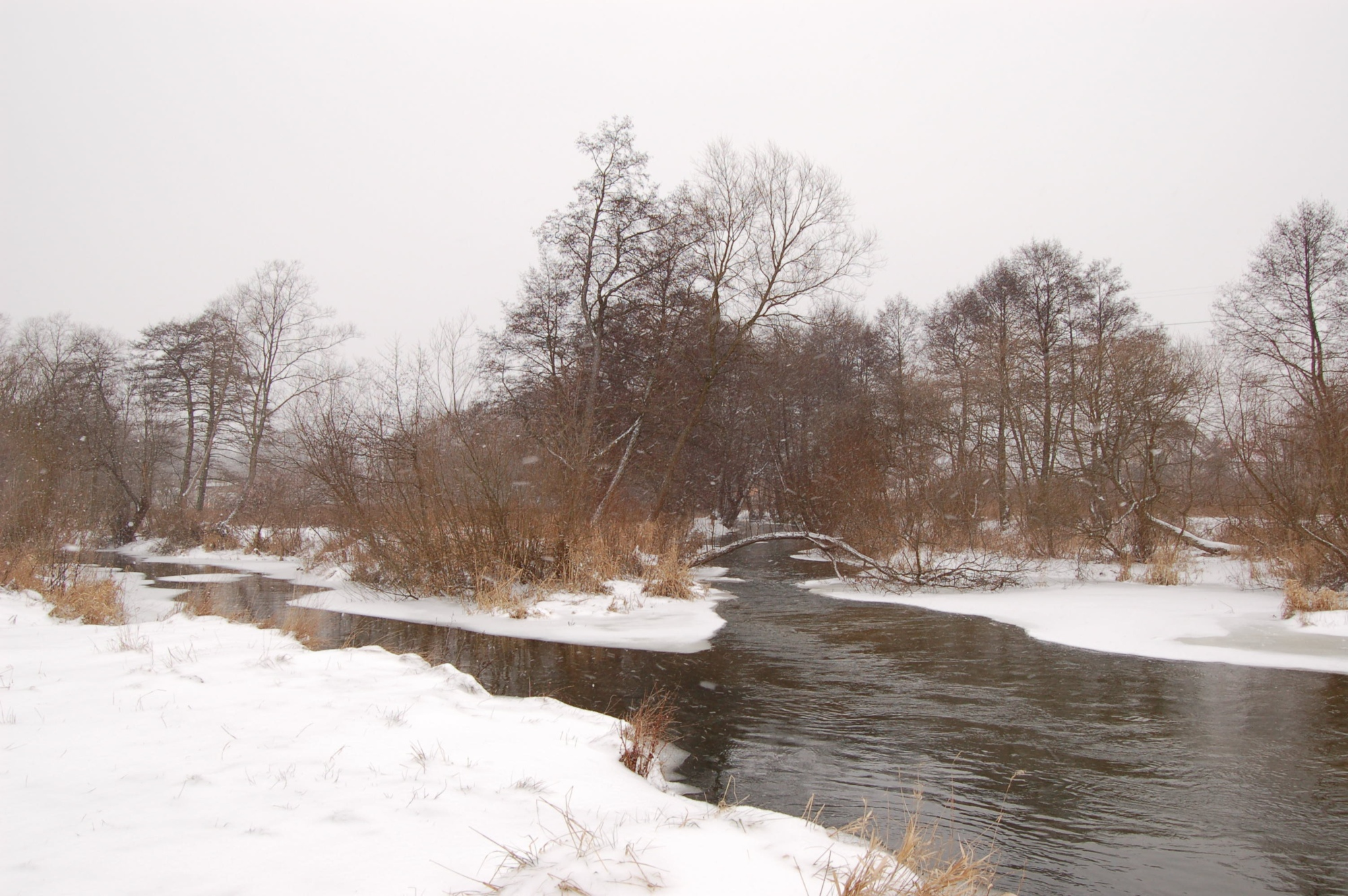
Łyski canal

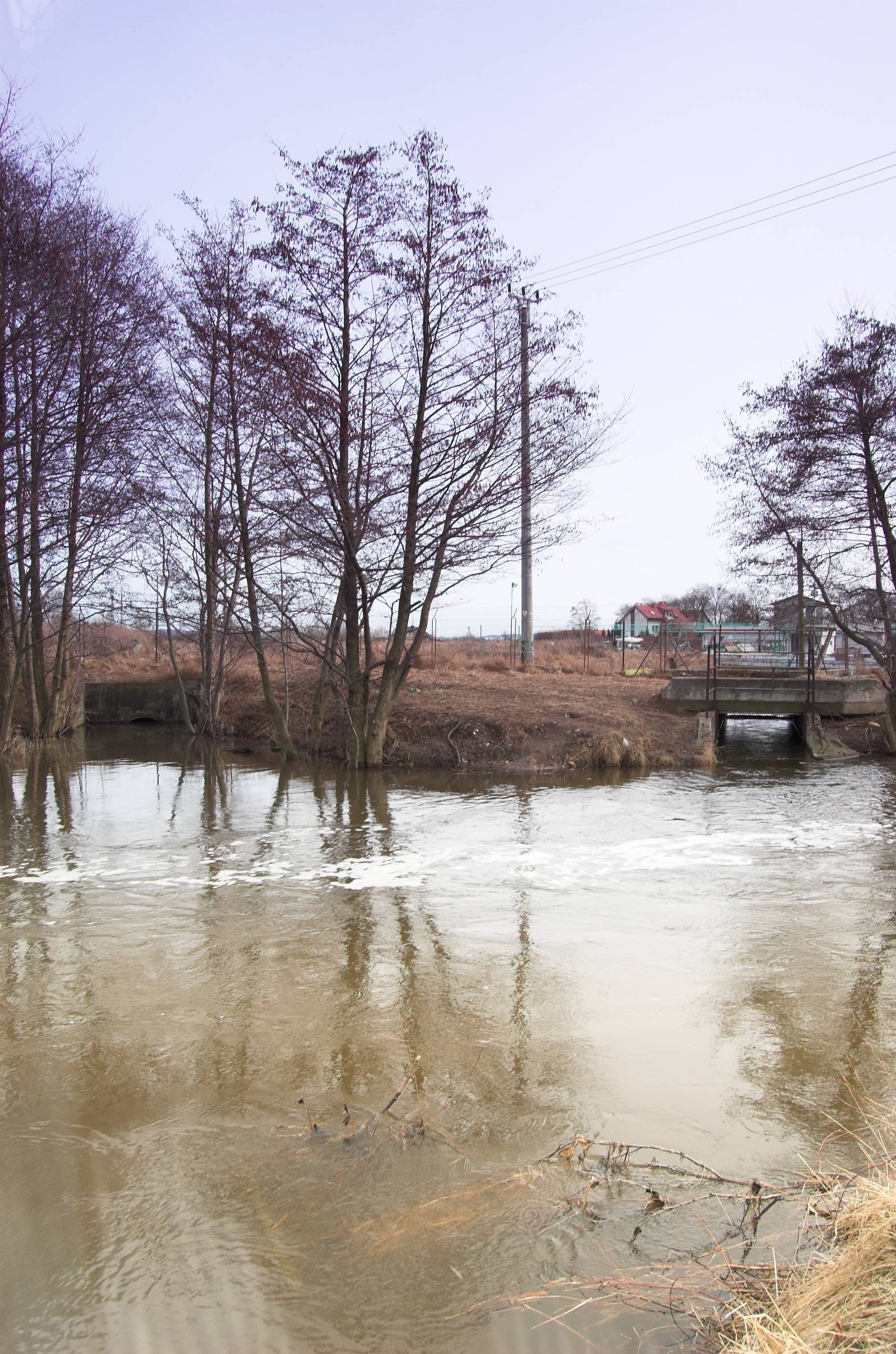
Fish farm
The lower course: Mostowe Błota

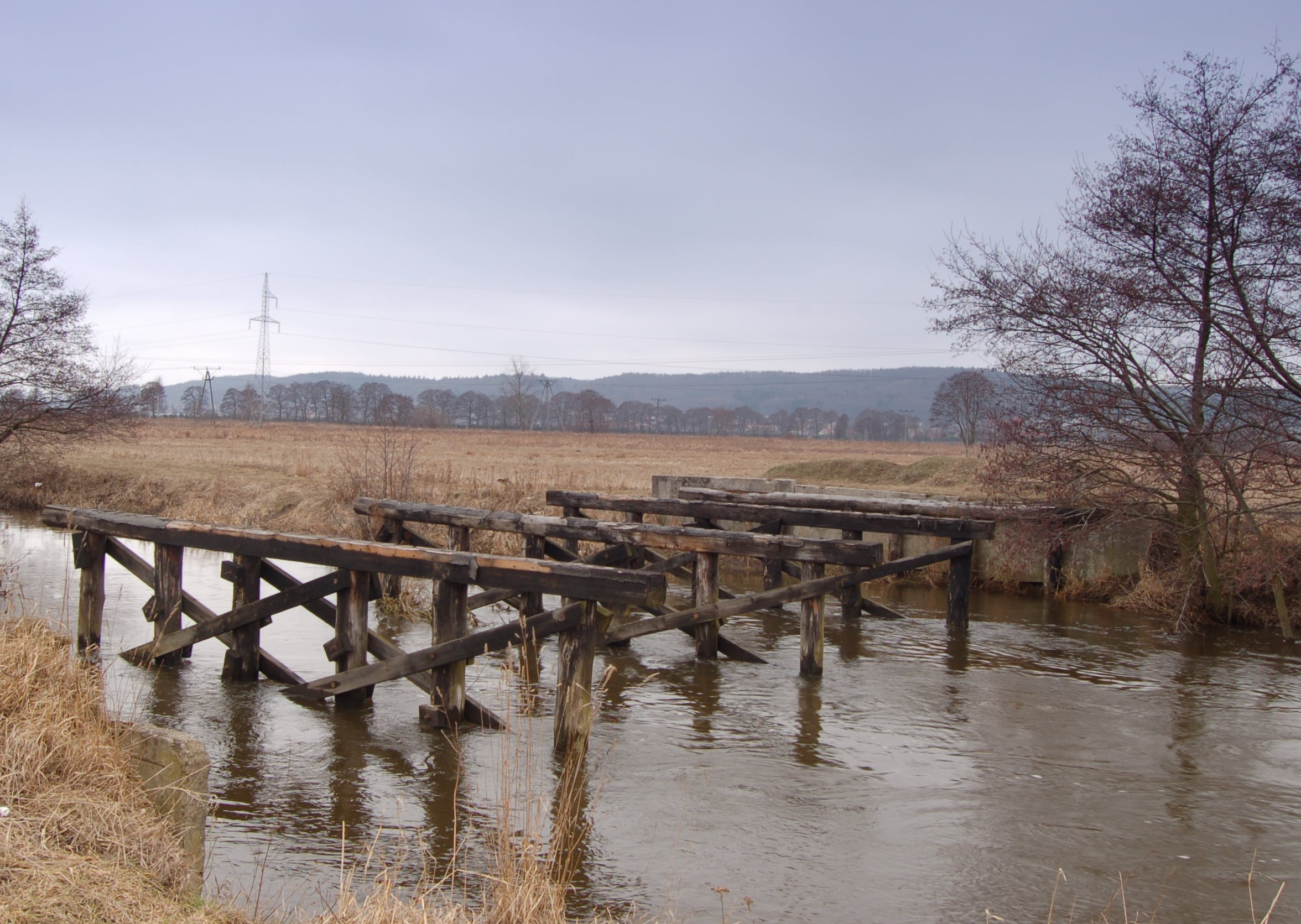
Destroyed bridge

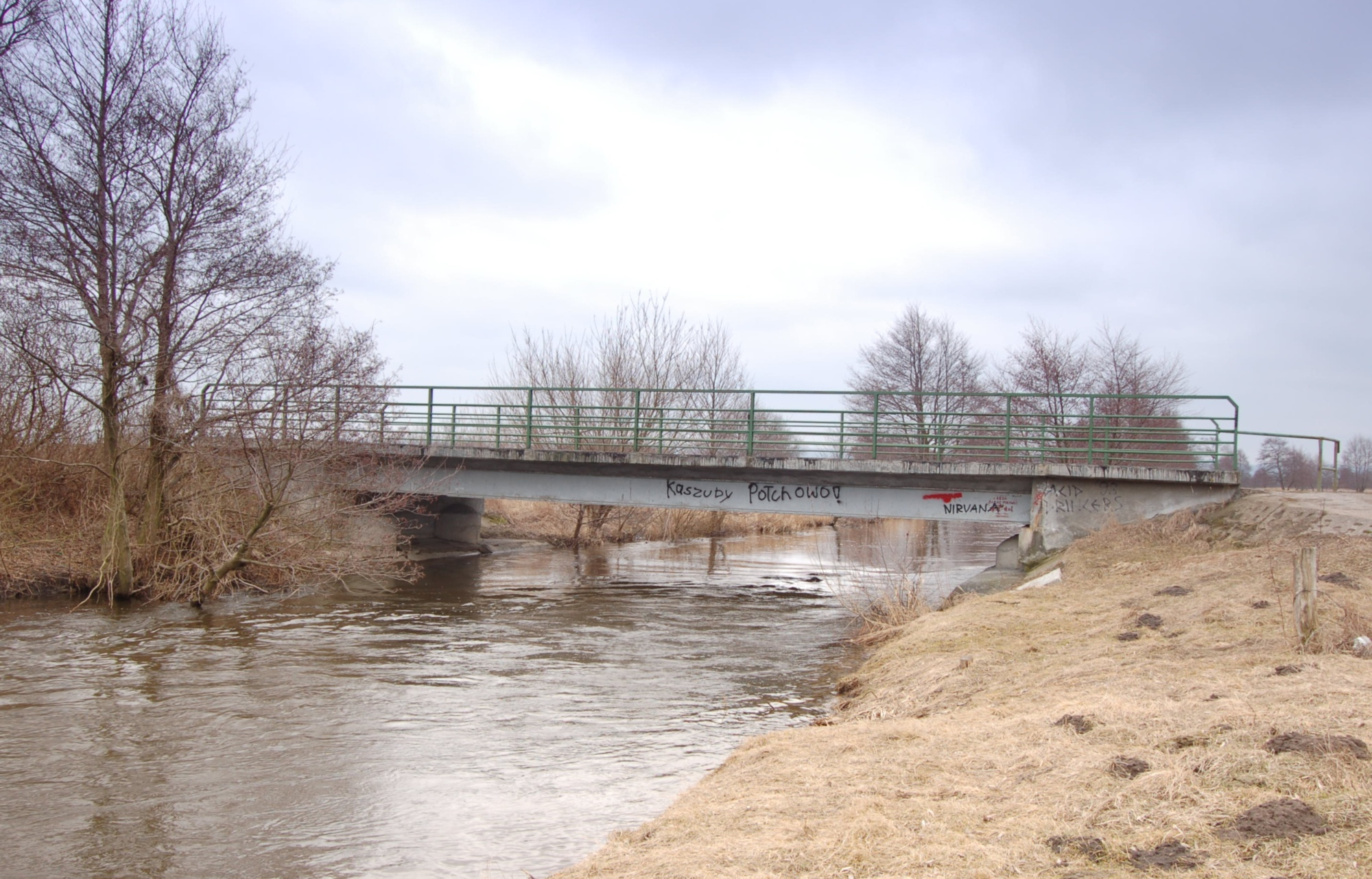
Bridge

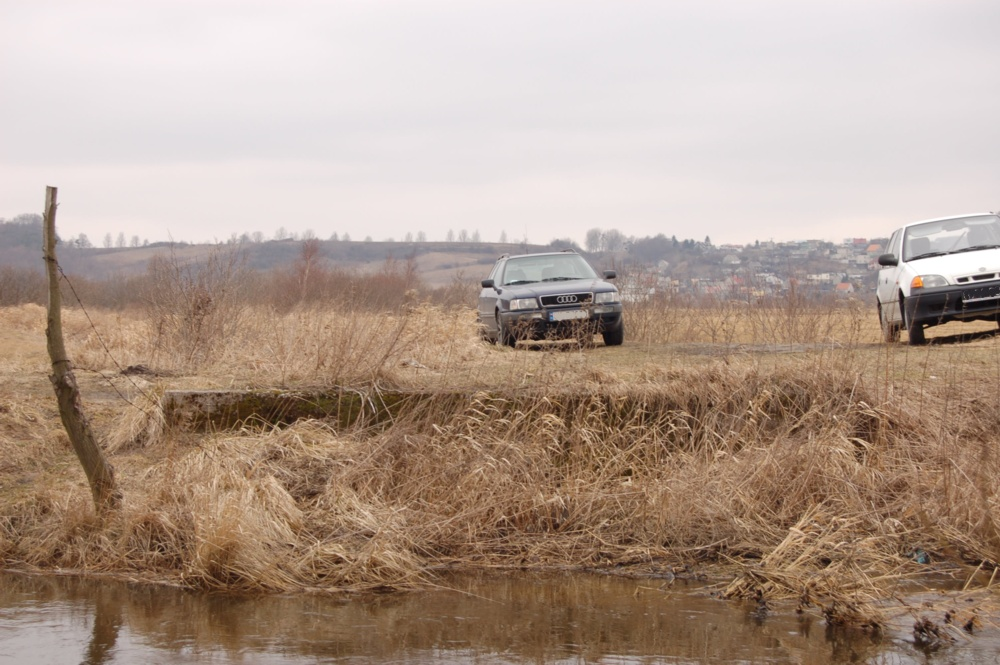
Former bridge anchor

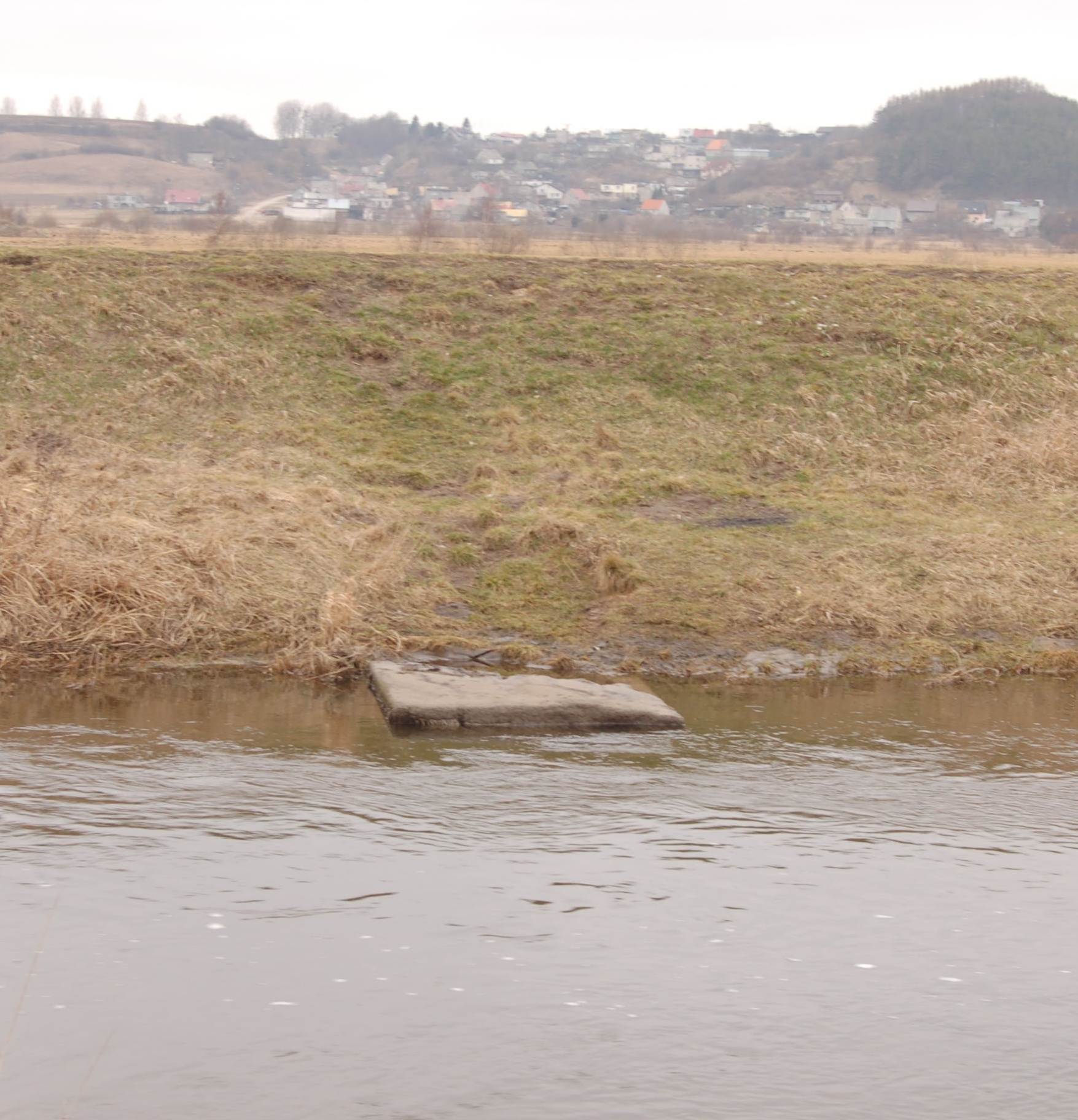
Fishing spot

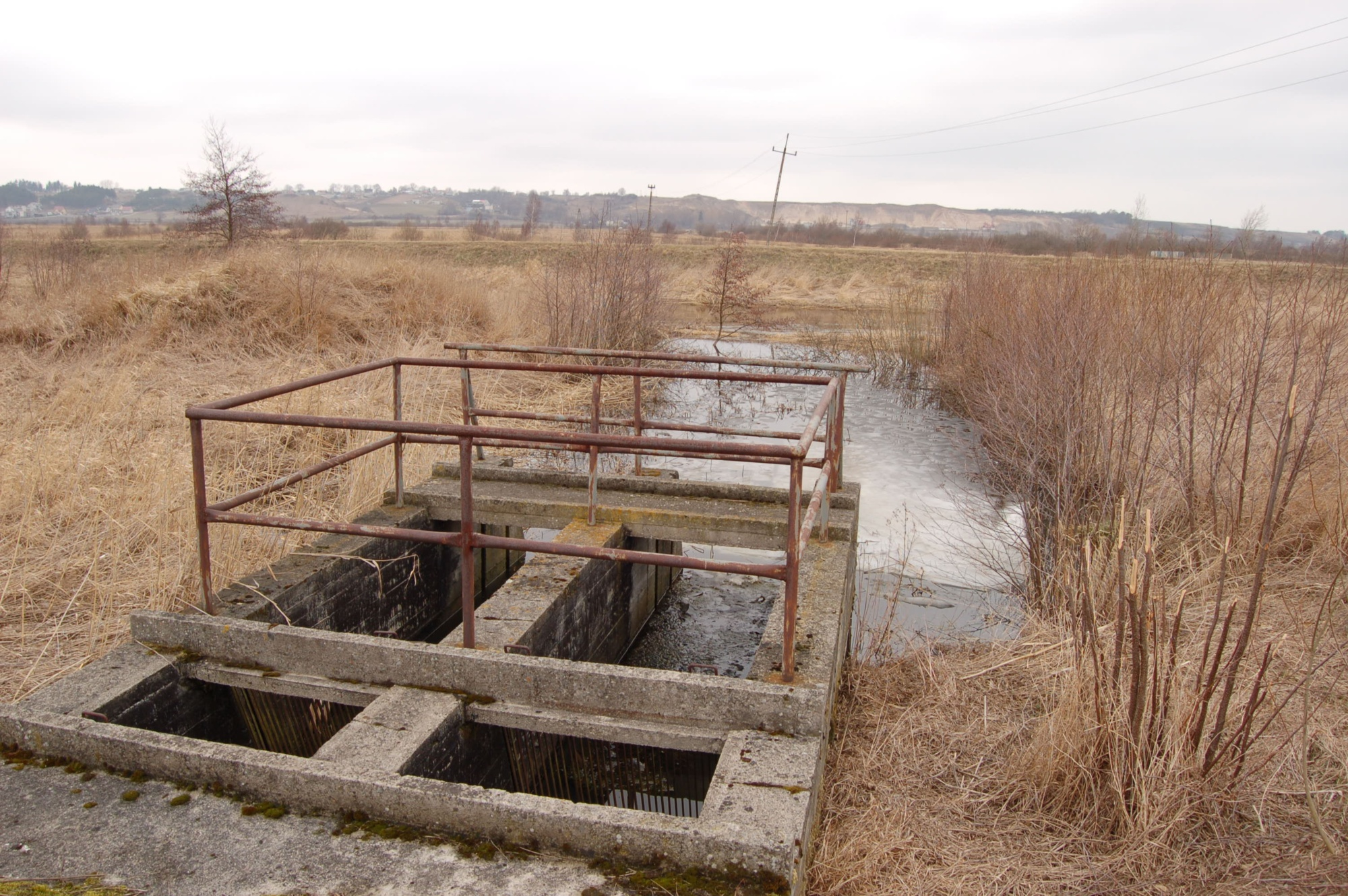
Water outtake

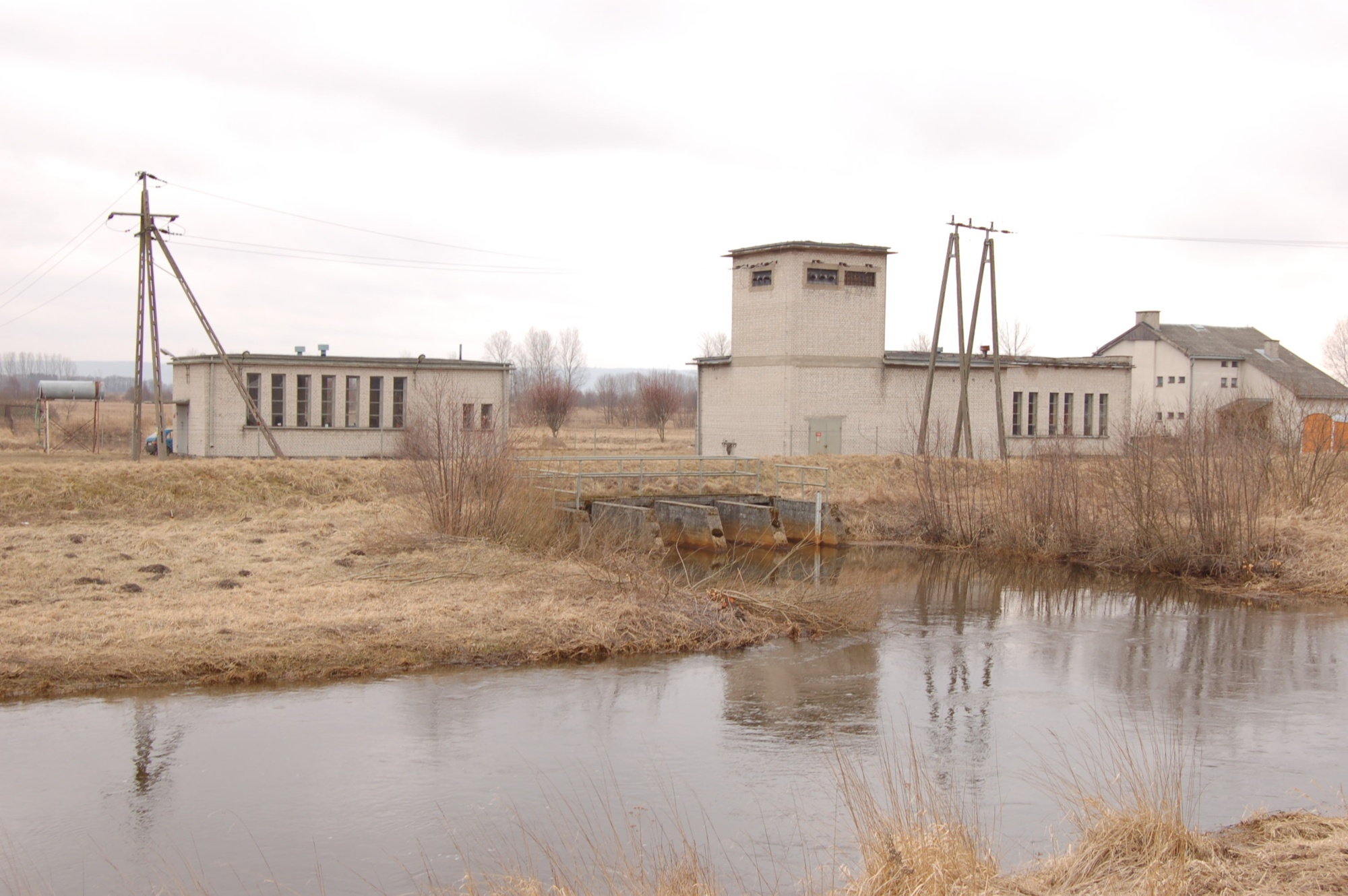
Water station

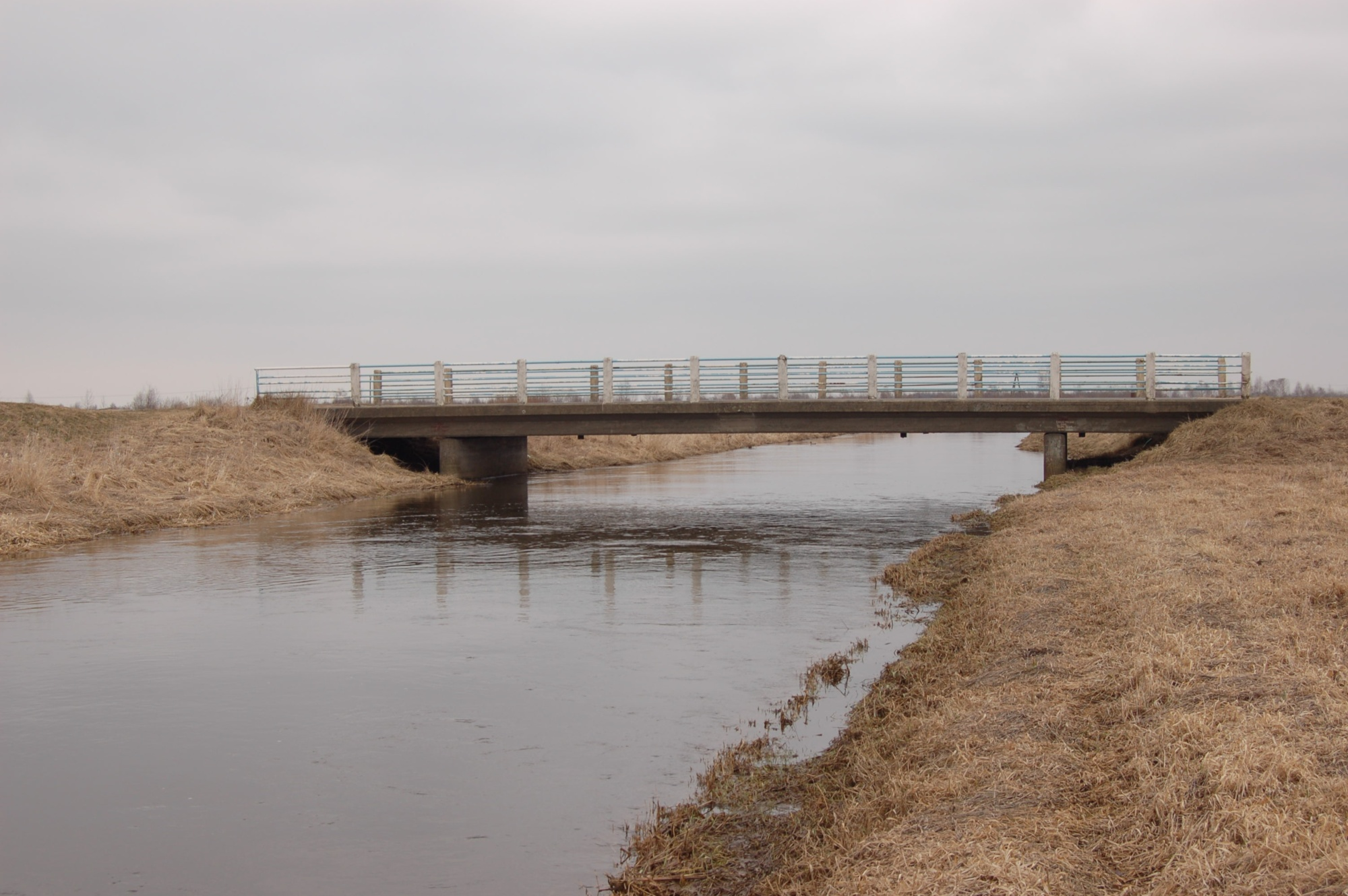
New concrete bridge

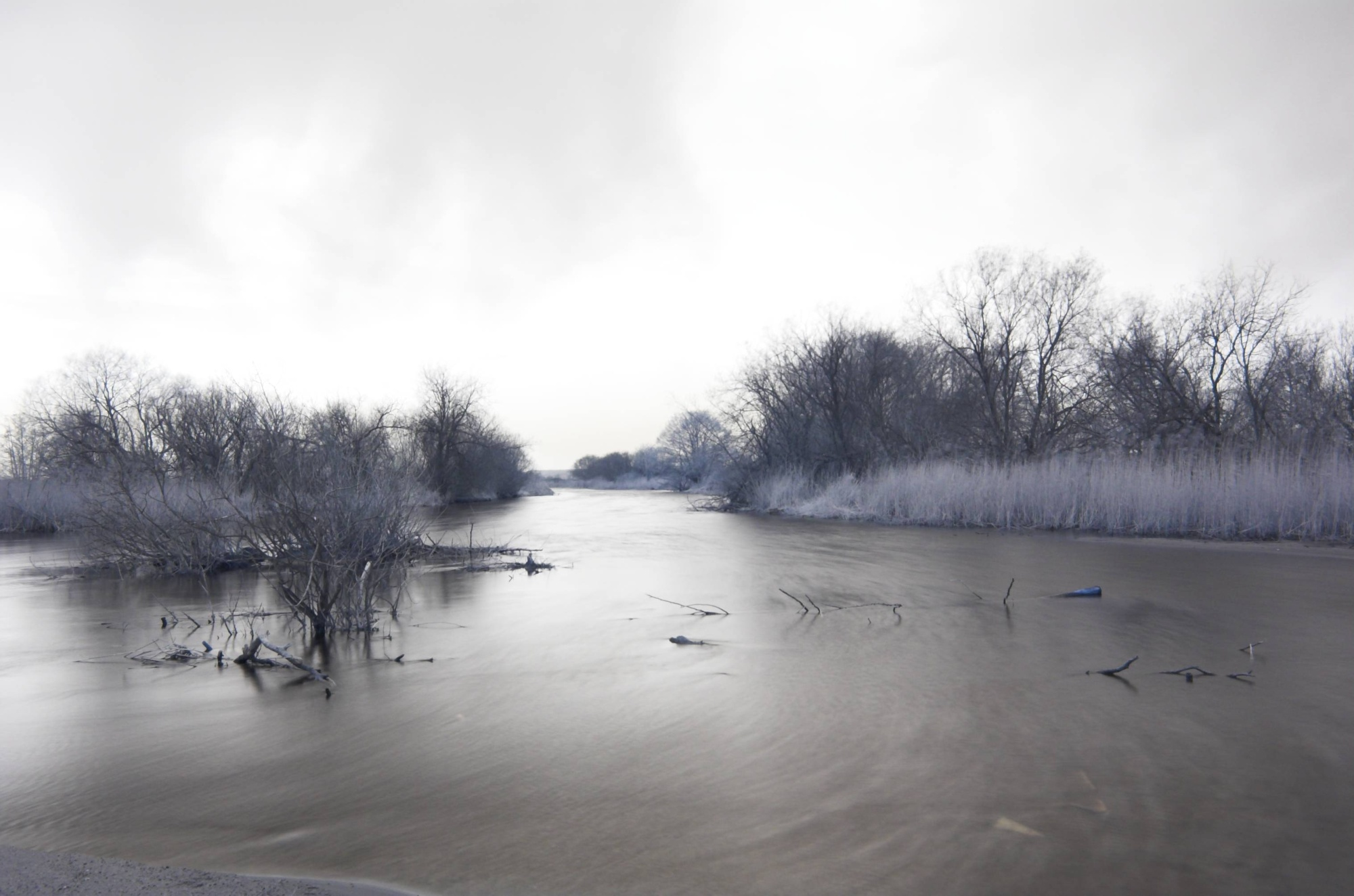
River mouth

== See also ==
- Media related to Reda (river) at Wikimedia Commons
- Bolszewka
