= Darżlubie =

- Village
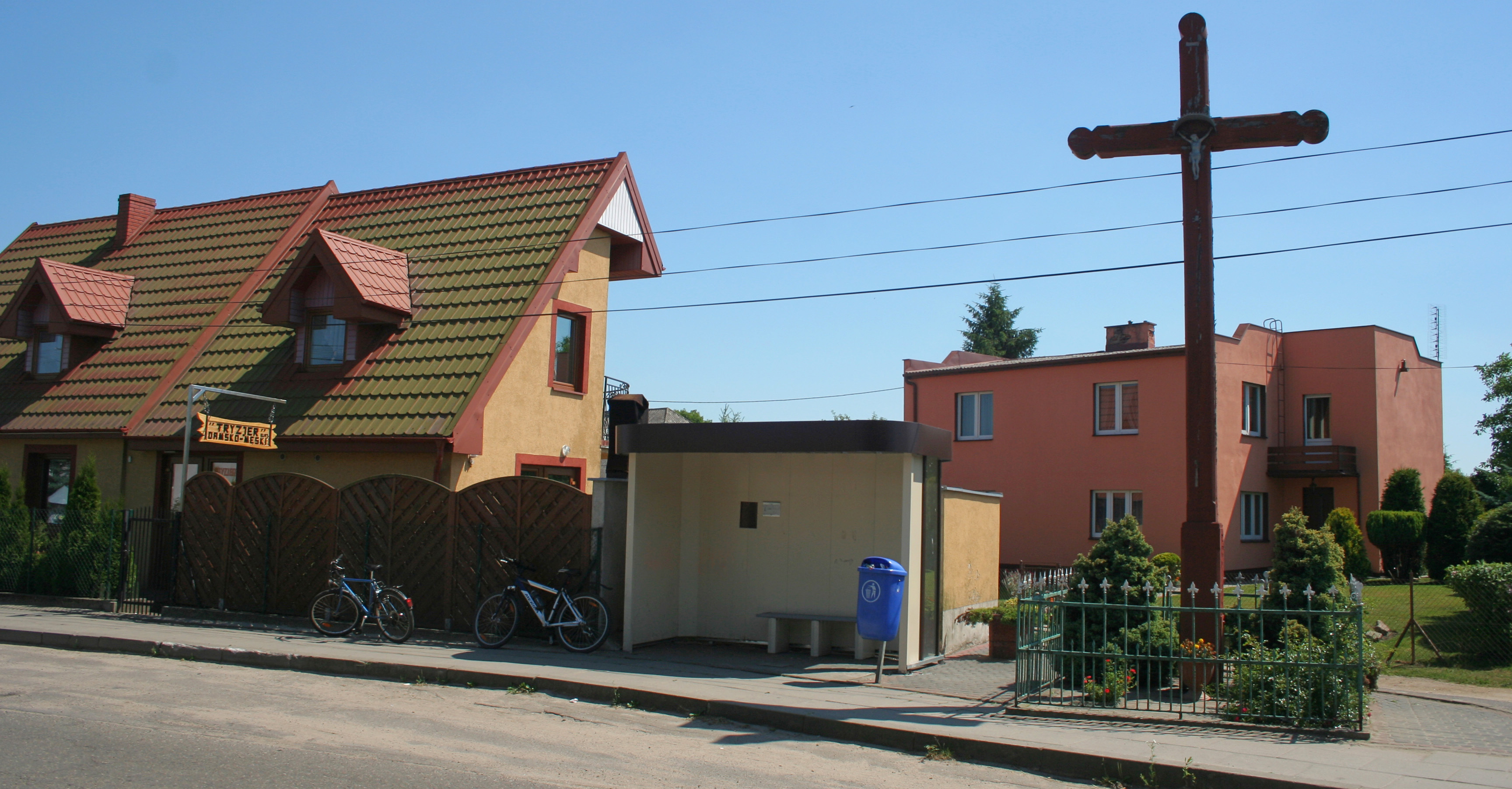
- Bus stop Darżlubie. Barber shop (left)

- Location within Poland
- Coordinates: 54°42′12″N 18°19′23″E
- Country: Poland
- Voivodeship: Pomeranian
- County: Puck
- Gmina: Puck
- Population: 788

Darżlubie ([darˈʐlubjɛ]; German: Darslub, 1942–43 Buchheide, 1943–45 Darpstedt) is a village in the administrative district of Gmina Puck, within Puck County, Pomeranian Voivodeship, in northern Poland.

The village gives its name to Puszcza Darżlubska (English: Darżlubie Forest, or Darżlubska Wilderness), a place of Polish and Jewish martyrology during World War II.

== See also ==
- History of Pomerania

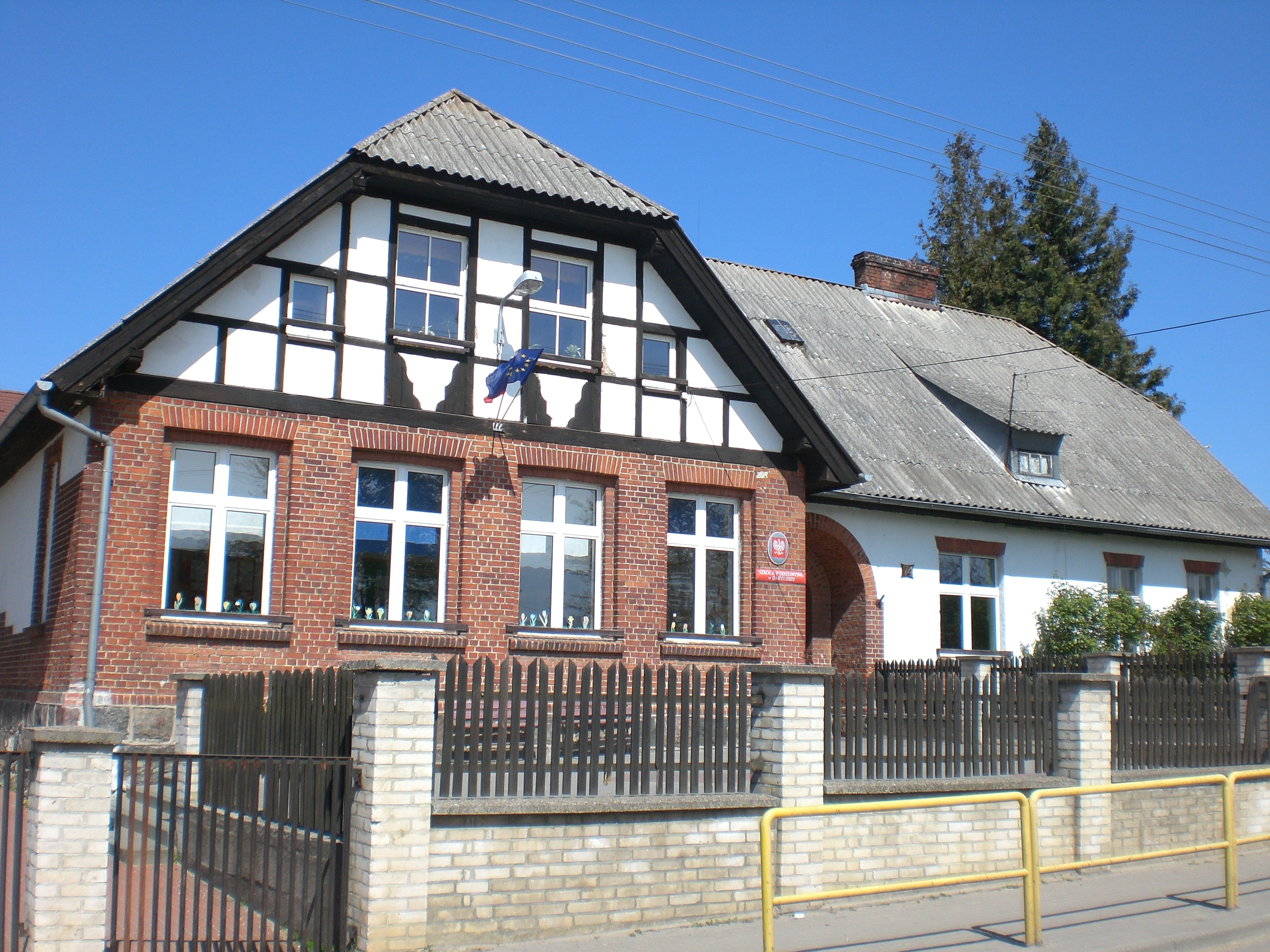
School building, Darżlubie
