= Protected areas of Poland =

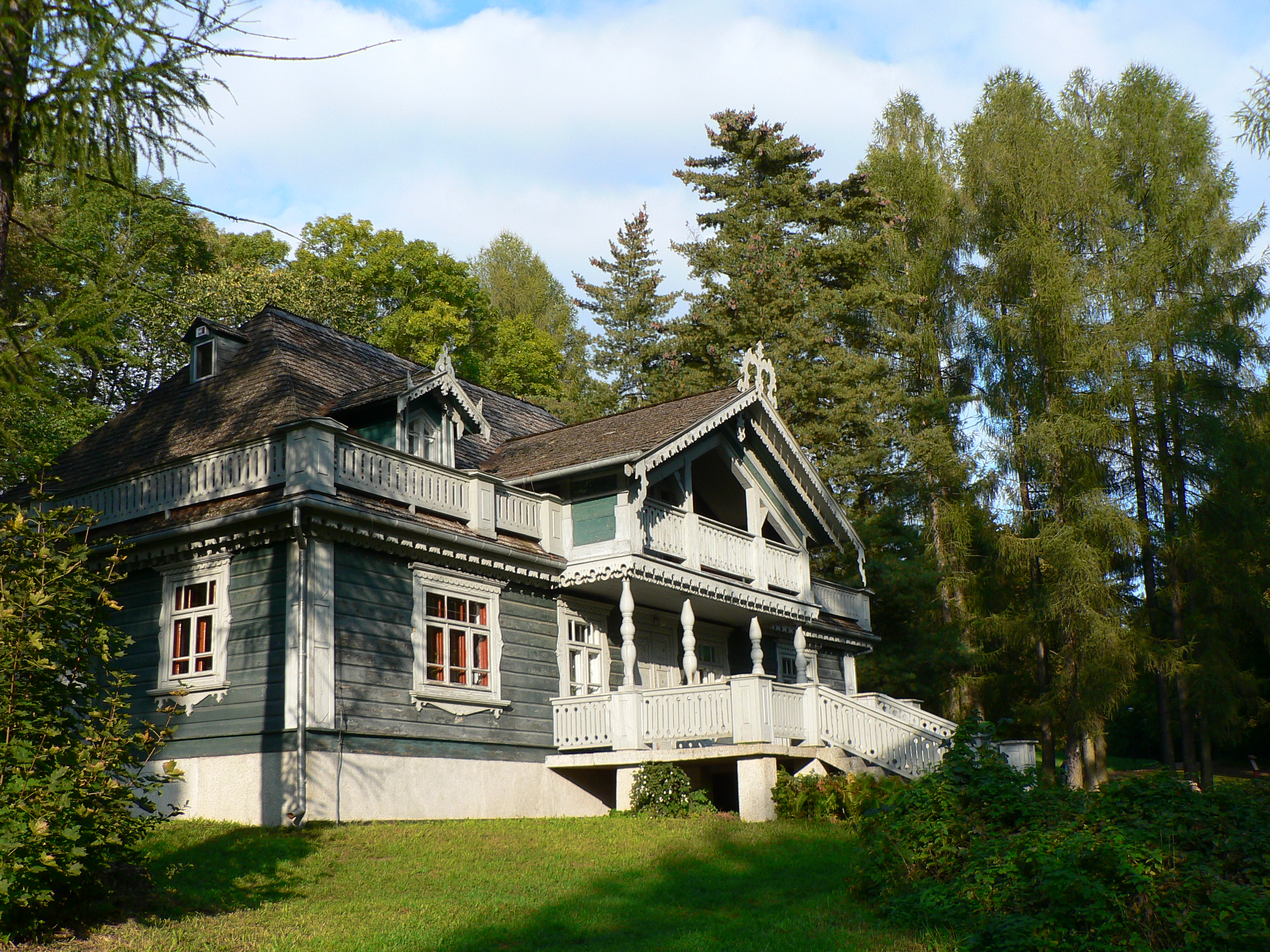
Centre for Nature Education at the Białowieża National Park, Poland

Protected areas of Poland include the following categories, as defined by the Act on Protection of Nature (Polish: Ustawa o ochronie przyrody) of 16 April 2004, by the Polish Parliament:

== National parks ==
There are 23 national parks in Poland. These were formerly run by the Polish Board of National Parks (Krajowy Zarząd Parków Narodowych), but in 2004 responsibility for them was transferred to the Ministry of the Environment. Most national parks are divided into strictly and partially protected zones. Additionally, they are usually surrounded by a protective buffer zone called otulina.

== Landscape parks ==
According to the Act on Protection of Nature (Ustawa o ochronie przyrody) of 2004, a Landscape Park (Parki Krajobrazowe) is defined as "an area protected because of its natural, historical, cultural and scenic values, for the purpose of conserving and popularizing those values in conditions of balanced development." As at 9 May 2009 there are 122 designated Landscape Parks throughout Poland, covering a total area of approximately 26,100 square kilometres (10,000 sq mi).

== Nature reserves ==
Nature reserves cover a total area of 1,644,634 hectares (4,063,980 acres), representing 0.53% of the territory of Poland. As of 2011, Poland has 1469 nature reserves. The Nature reserves in Poland are divided into categories: fauna (141), landscape (108), forest (722), peat-bog (177), flora (169), water (44), inanimate nature (72), steppe (32) and halophyte (4). Another division is into the regular and strict nature reserves; the strict ones see no human activity, whereas the regular ones see limited maintenance.

== Protected areas ==
Protected landscape areas (Polish: obszary chronionego krajobrazu) belong to some of the least restrictive zones of protection, with focus on qualified tourism and outdoor recreation. There were 419 protected landscape areas in Poland as of December 31, 2008 covering an area of 7,058,000 hectares (17,440,000 acres), or slightly over 23% of the country.

== Natura 2000 designated areas ==
About 500 Natura 2000 sites, ecological network of protected areas in the territory of the European Union including:

- 72 Special Protection Areas (Polish: Obszar Specjalnej Ochrony Ptaków, OSOP) locations to safeguard the habitats of migratory birds and certain particularly threatened birds.

- Site of Community Importance (Polish: Obszar mający znaczenie dla Wspólnoty) locations that contribute significantly to the maintenance or restoration at a favorable conservation status of a natural habitat type.
- Special Area of Conservation (Polish: Specjalny obszar ochrony siedlisk, SOOS)

== Other designated sites ==
- Geological "documentary sites" (Polish: stanowiska dokumentacyjne)
- Over 6,000 "ecological sites" (Polish: użytki ekologiczne)
- "Nature and landscape complexes" (Polish: zespoły przyrodniczo-krajobrazowe)
- About 33,000 natural monuments (mainly trees, also some caves etc.)

Poland also has the following internationally designated sites:

== Biosphere Reserves ==
UNESCO Biosphere Reserves are environment-protected scientific-research institutions of international status that are created with the intent for conservation in a natural state the most typical natural complexes of biosphere, conducting background ecological monitoring, studying of the surrounding natural environment, its changes under the activity of anthropogenic factors.

Biosphere Preserves are created on the base of nature preserves or national parks including to their composition territories and objects of other categories of nature-preserving fund and other lands as well as including in the established order the World Network of Biosphere Reserves in the UNESCO framework "Man and the Biosphere Programme". There are 9 Biosphere Reserves in Poland.

== World Heritage Sites ==
A UNESCO World Heritage Site is a place (such as a forest, mountain, lake, island, desert, monument, building, complex, or city) that is listed by UNESCO as sites of outstanding cultural or natural importance to the common heritage of humanity. There are fourteen (17 in 2026) World Heritage Sites in Poland (1 (Note: The natural site Belovezhskaya Pushcha / Białowieża Forest is shared between Belarus and Poland.) Natural and 13 (Note: The cultural site Muskauer Park / Park Mużakowski is shared between Germany and Poland.) (Note: The cultural site "Wooden Tserkvas of Carpathian Region in Poland and Ukraine" is shared between Poland and Ukraine) Cultural). The first two sites were inscribed on the World Heritage List in 1978. Three of the sites, Belovezhskaya Pushcha / Białowieża Forest, Wooden Tserkvas of Carpathian Region in Poland and Ukraine and Muskauer Park / Park Mużakowski are shared with neighboring countries (Belarus, Ukraine and Germany). Poland also has six sites on the Tentative List.

== Ramsar Convention sites ==
The Ramsar Convention on Wetlands is an international treaty for the conservation and sustainable utilization of wetlands, i.e., to stem the progressive encroachment on and loss of wetlands now and in the future, recognizing the fundamental ecological functions of wetlands and their economic, cultural, scientific, and recreational value. Since the convention became effective in Poland on 22 March 1978, the designation of Wetland of International Importance has been applied to thirteen locations in the country, which combine to form an area of 145,075 ha (358,490 acres).
