= Bolszewo =

- Village
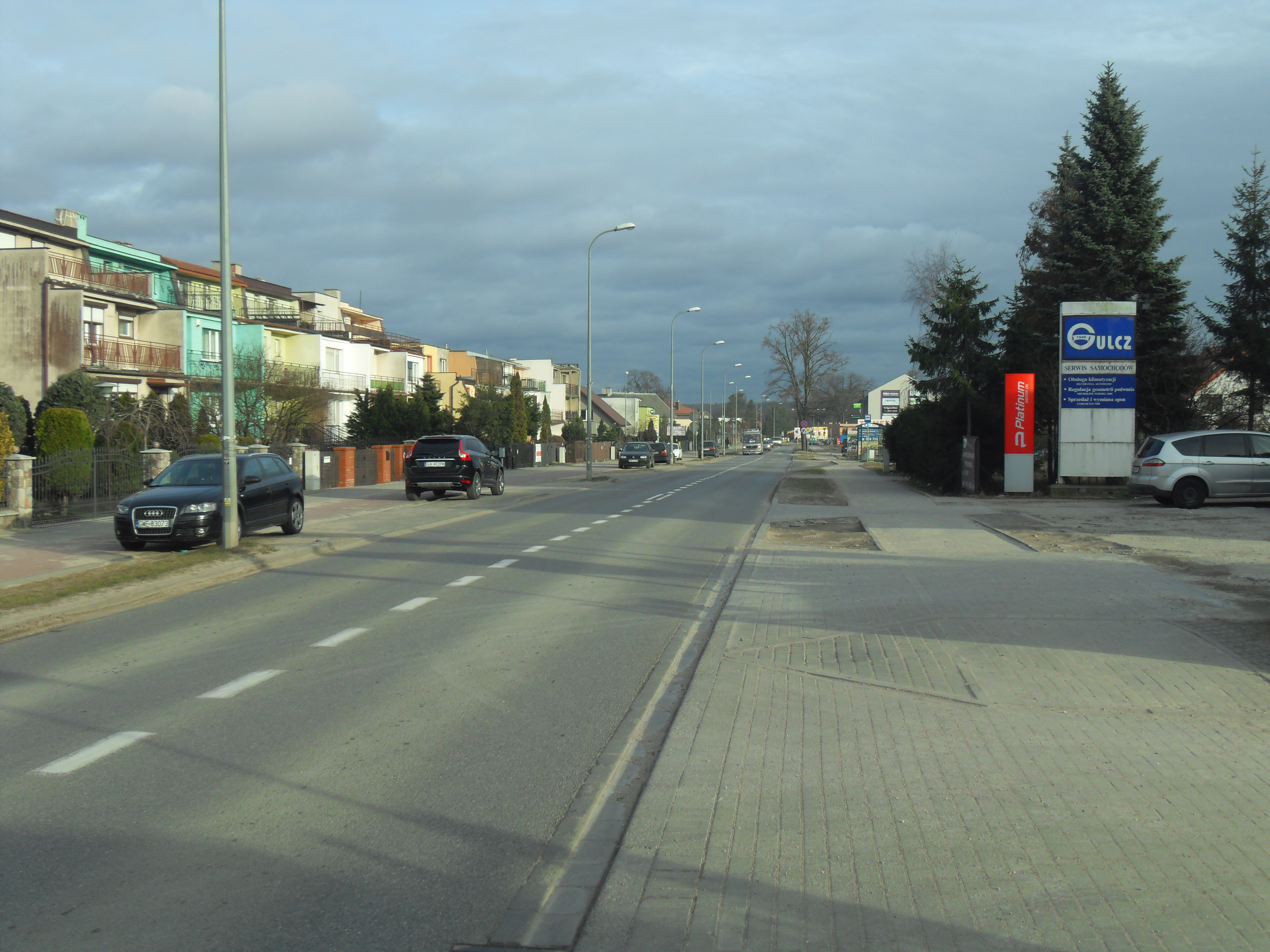

- Location within Poland
- Coordinates: 54°37′27″N 18°10′31″E
- Country: Poland
- Voivodeship: Pomeranian
- County: Wejherowo
- Gmina: Wejherowo
- Population: 7,064
- Time zone: UTC+1 (CET)
  - Summer (DST): UTC+2 (CEST)
- Vehicle registration: GWE

Bolszewo [bɔlˈʂɛvɔ] is a village in the administrative district of Gmina Wejherowo, within Wejherowo County, Pomeranian Voivodeship, in northern Poland. It is located in the ethnocultural region of Kashubia in the historic region of Pomerania.

== History ==
During the German occupation of Poland (World War II), Bolszewo was one of the sites of executions of Poles, carried out by the Germans in 1939 as part of the Intelligenzaktion, A local teacher was among Polish teachers murdered in the Dachau concentration camp.

== Sport ==
The village is home to the football club Cassubian Bolszewo who compete in Klasa B.
