= Swarzewo–Krokowa railway =

Railway line in Poland

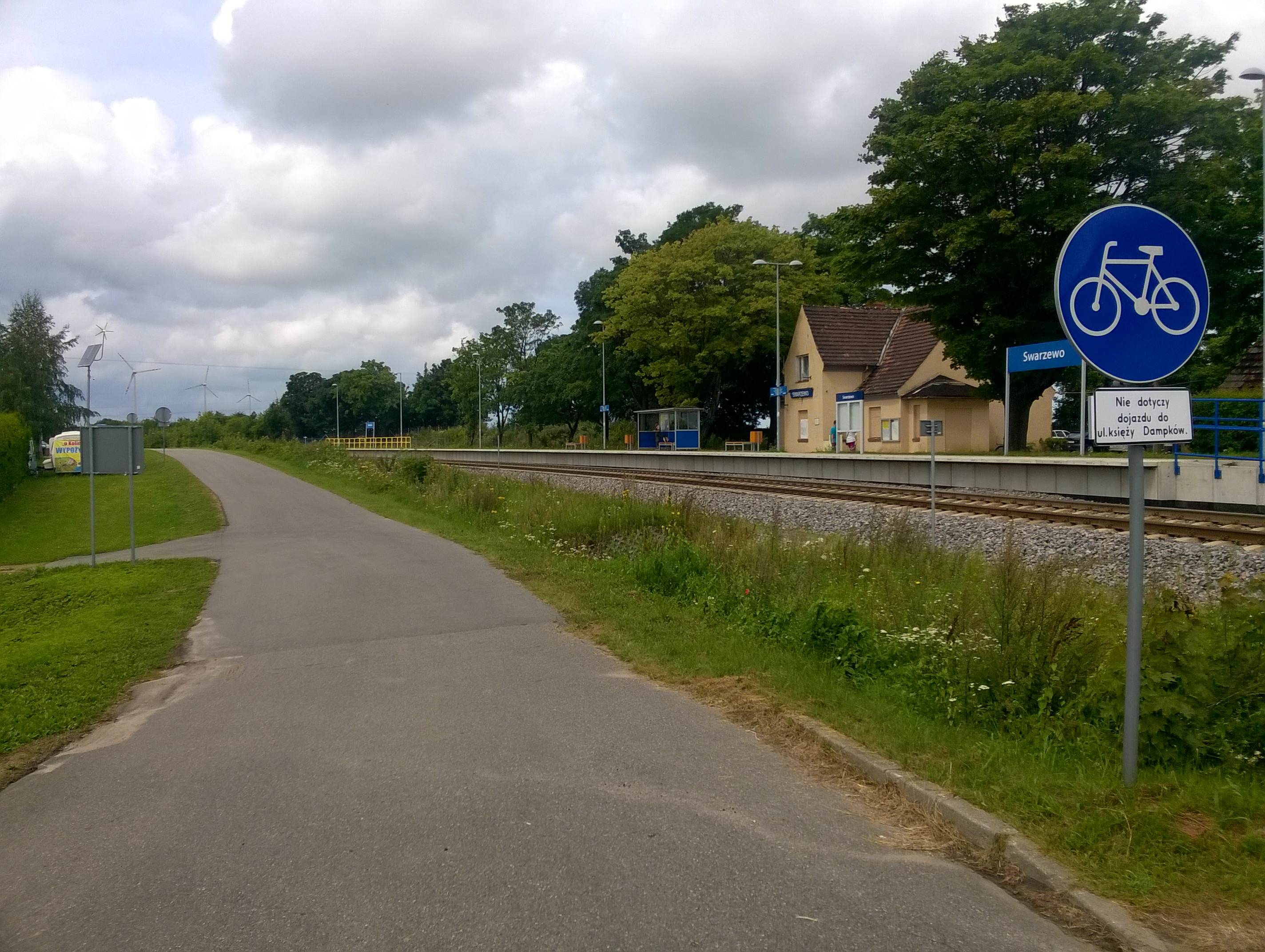
- Beginning of the bicycle path built along the former railway

Overview
- Line number: 263
- Termini: Swarzewo; Krokowa

History
- Closed: 1989 (passenger traffic); 1991 (freight traffic)

Technical
- Line length: 17.404 km (10.814 mi)
- Track gauge: 1,435 mm (4 ft 8 1/2 in)
- Operating speed: 50 km/h (31 mph)

Swarzewo–Krokowa railway was a railway with a length of 17.404 km, connecting Swarzewo with Krokowa. Its construction was completed in 1903. Passenger train service on this line was suspended in 1989, and freight service in 1991. The line was dismantled at the end of 2005.

== Route ==
Swarzewo–Krokowa railway branched off from Reda–Hel railway just past the Swarzewo railway station, located between the villages of Swarzewo and Gnieżdżewo. Before reaching Łebcz, the line made a slight left turn. Between Łebcz and Starzyński Dwór, it curved 90° to the left. Between Starzyński Dwór and Radoszewo, the line first made a sharp right turn and then another left turn. On the way to Kłanino, it veered to the right. From there, following a rather winding path, the line reached Krokowa.

Swarzewo–Krokowa railway was entirely located within Puck County and the Kashubian Coast mesoregion.

== Technical characteristics ==
The line was dismantled in 2005.

== History ==
=== Origins ===
During the 1880s and 1890s, the railway network in Prussia expanded significantly. After the construction of major railways, local lines connecting district towns began to emerge. In December 1897, construction started on the first section of what would become modern Reda–Hel railway. This section was opened on 15 December 1898 despite challenging geological and geomorphological conditions.

=== 1901–1922 ===
The Reda–Hel railway was initially intended to reach Krokowa; however, construction only began in 1901 and was completed in 1903. The section between Puck and Swarzewo was designated as line 213, while the remaining stretch to Krokowa was numbered 263. The line to Krokowa was built and managed by the Kleinbahn-Aktiengesellschaft Putzig – Krockow company, whose shareholders included the state treasury, the province of West Prussia, Puck County in Danzig, the railway construction company Lenz & Co, and Count von Krockow. Originally, there were plans to extend the line to Żarnowiec and Odargowo, but these were abandoned due to financial constraints. Construction work was carried out by the Berlin-based company Lenz & Co.

Following Poland's regaining of independence in 1918, the country's borders were not finalized until 1920. That year, the railway from Puck to Krokowa was incorporated into Polish territory. Due to coal supply shortages for steam locomotives, substitute transportation by horse-drawn carriages was introduced in 1920. Similar measures were implemented on other railways in Pomerania at the time.

In 1921, train services between Puck and Krokowa were suspended for six months due to the construction of the railway to Hel, which was completed in 1922. Around the same time, the Kleinbahn-Aktiengesellschaft Putzig – Krockow company was dissolved, as the state shareholder was not interested in a foreign-owned line, local governments had ceased to exist formally, and private investors were unable to manage the financial burden.

=== 1922–1945 ===
On 1 April 1922, the line was transferred to the management of Polish State Railways. This transition improved connections at Puck railway station, ensuring better train links to Hel and Gdańsk.

On 6 September 1929, a minor accident occurred on the line when a passenger train from Puck to Krokowa derailed a few hundred meters before the final station. The only injured person was a postal conductor, who suffered minor injuries.

That same year, the line underwent major renovations using rails salvaged from dismantled railways, which had originally been produced in the late 19th century. Between 1936 and 1937, a bridge over the Płutnica river was repaired.

On 27 September 1939, the line came under the control of Deutsche Reichsbahn. During World War II, the railway suffered little damage, apart from the closure of the locomotive depot in Krokowa. The only significant track modification was the construction of a siding to the Kłanino estate.

=== 1945–1989 ===
Train operations resumed in 1945, with the number of daily train pairs gradually increasing to three.

In 1964, diesel traction was introduced on the line.

By the 1970s, a lack of maintenance led to a drastic reduction in train speeds, making rail transport increasingly uncompetitive compared to more flexible bus services. In 1979, passenger services between Puck and Krokowa were suspended for the second time, though they were reinstated in May 1983. Just before the service was restored, the line underwent its final modernization. To improve attractiveness, trains to Krokowa were extended to start in Reda, allowing passengers to transfer to the Szybka Kolej Miejska commuter trains to the Tricity and Wejherowo.

=== After 1989 ===
For the third time, train services between Puck and Krokowa were suspended in the late 1980s and early 1990s. Passenger trains ceased operating in May 1989, followed by freight trains in 1991.

After 2000, there were attempts to revive the line, including for draisine rides. However, in the summer of 2005, a tender was announced for its dismantling. In 2011, an asphalt cycling path was built along the former railway route.

== Infrastructure ==
=== Junction ===
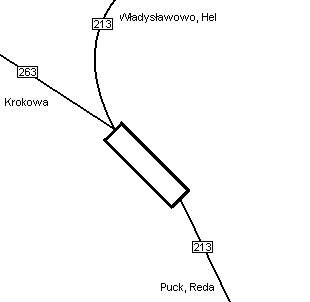
Connection with Reda–Hel railway

Swarzewo–Krokowa railway was connected exclusively to Reda–Hel railway at Swarzewo railway station.

=== Operational points ===
There were seven operational points along the line:

- Swarzewo
- Łebcz
- Starzyński Dwór
- Radoszewo
- Kłanino
- Sławoszyno
- Krokowa
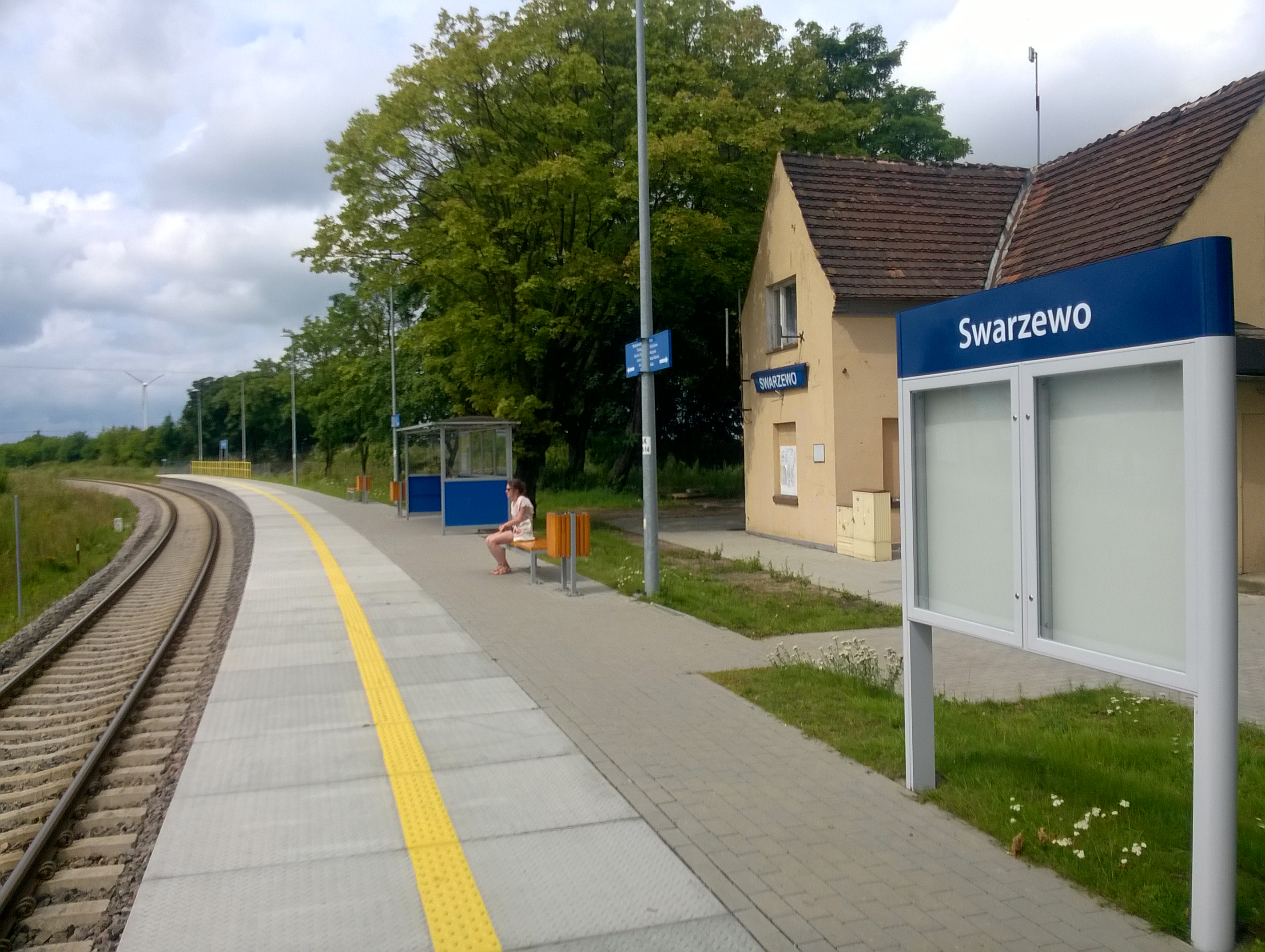
Swarzewo

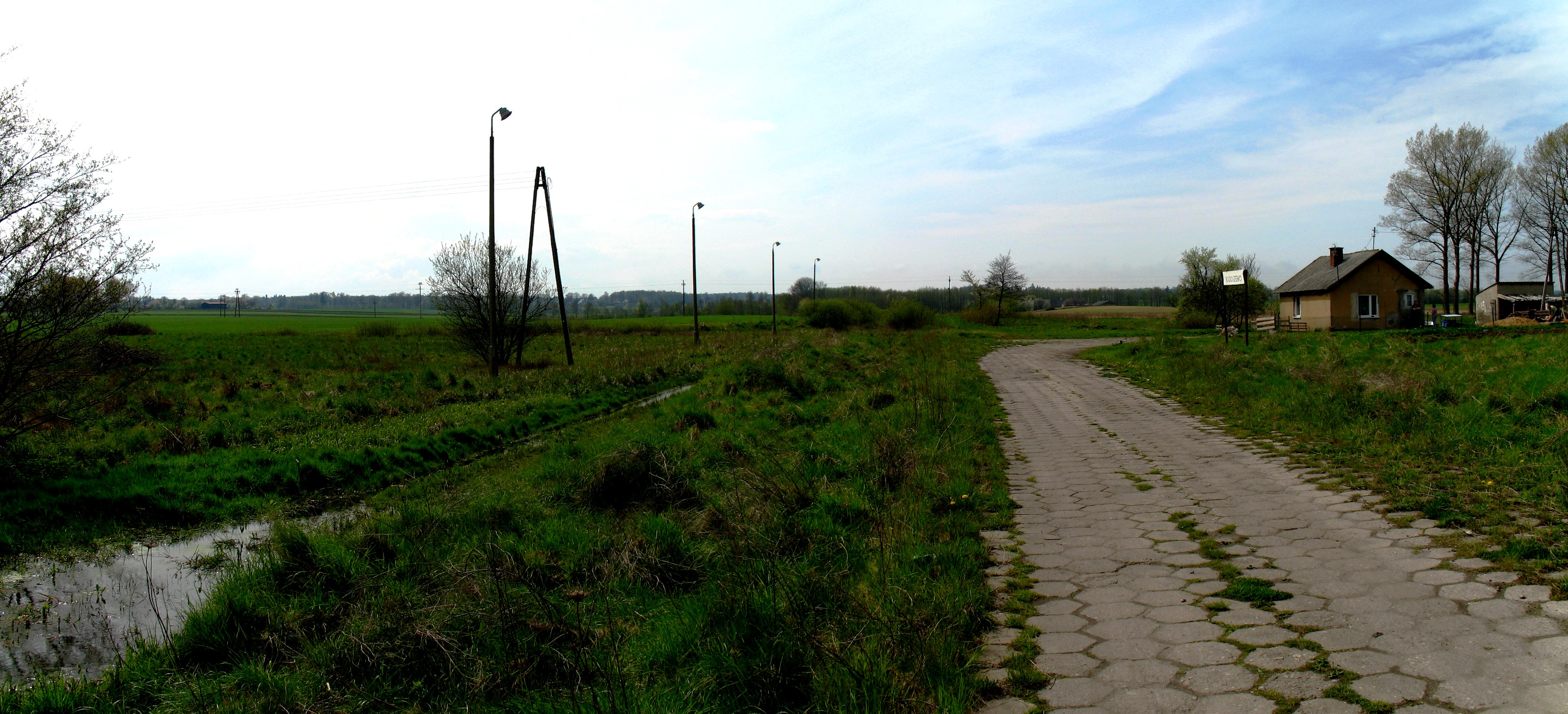
Radoszewo

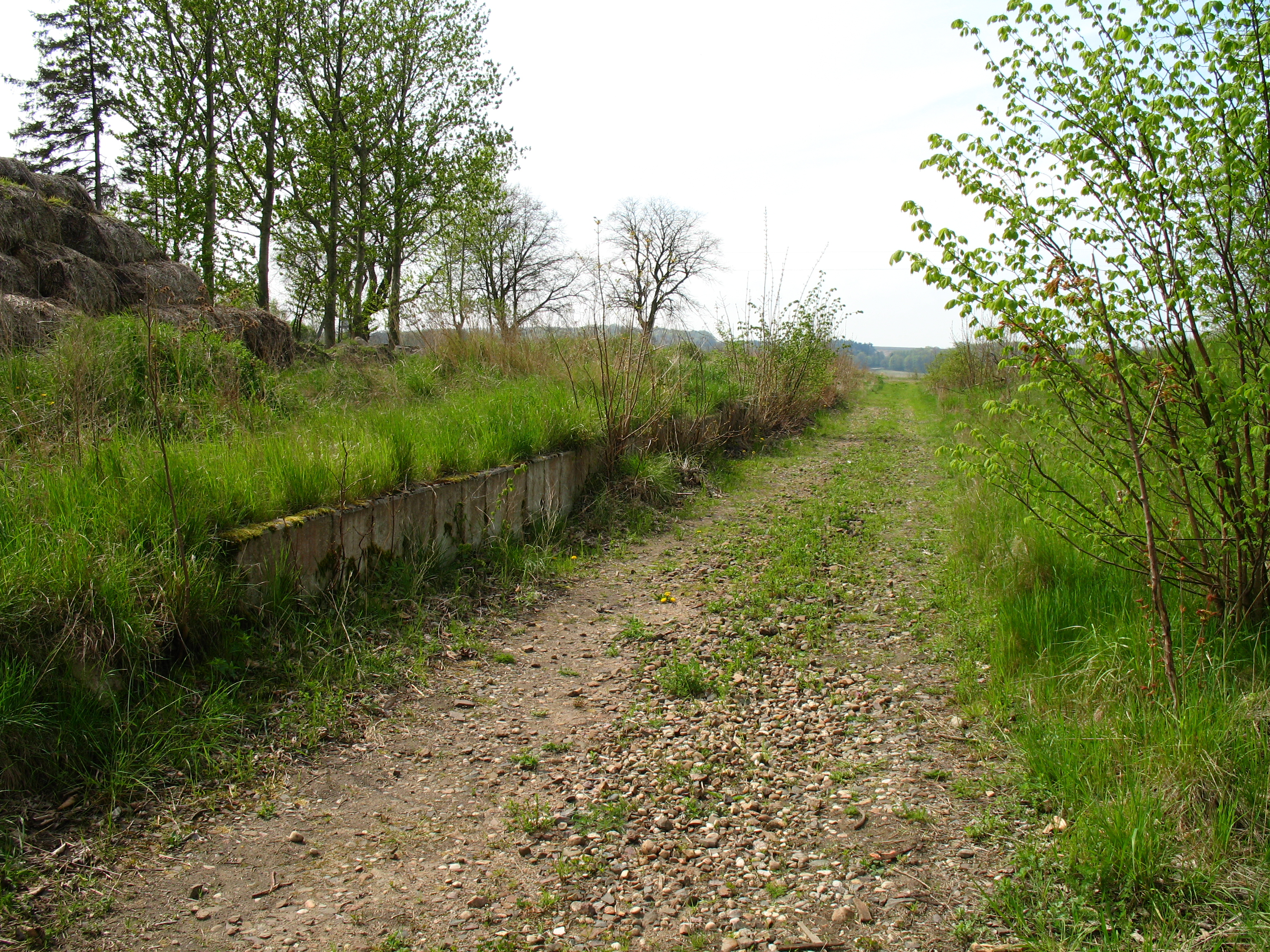
Kłanino

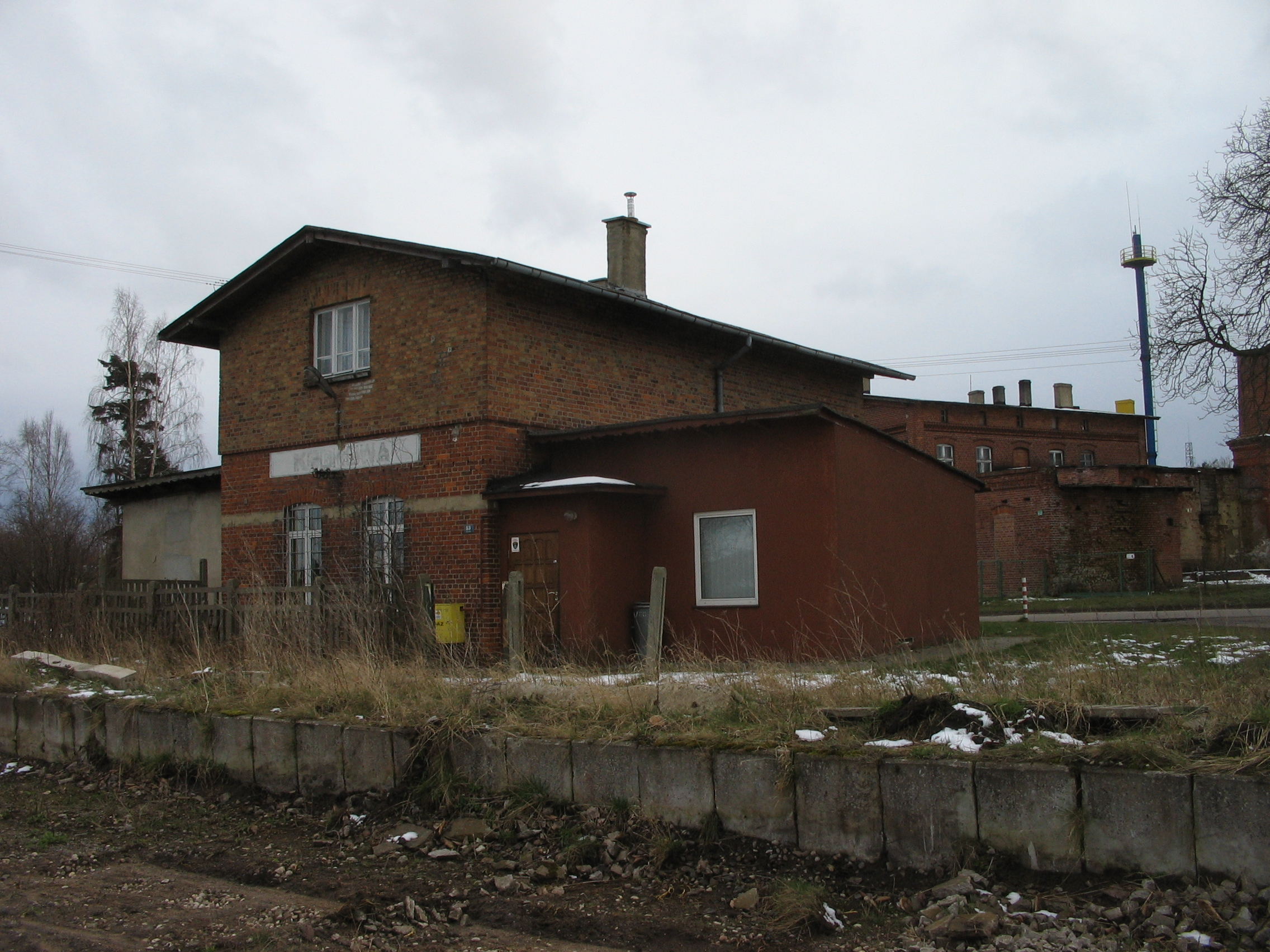
Krokowa

== Train operations ==
Passenger train services on this route ceased in May 1989, followed by freight services in 1991.
