= Kłanino railway station =

Railway station in Pomeranian Voivodeship, Poland

Coordinates: 54°46′00″N 18°14′48″E

Kłanino
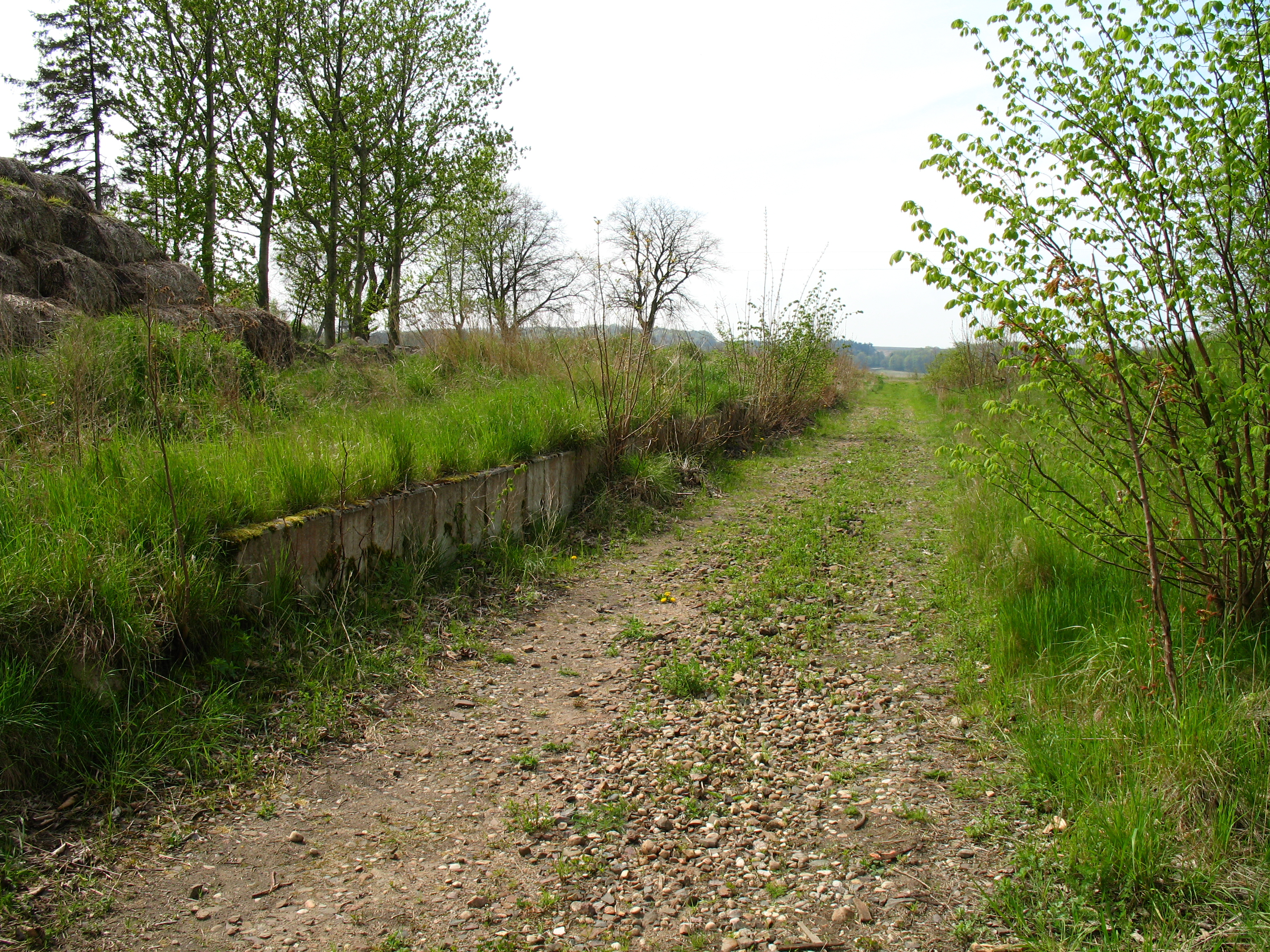

General information
- Location: Kłanino; Poland
- Owner: Polskie Koleje Państwowe S.A.
- Platforms: 1

Construction
- Structure type: Building: Never existed Depot: Never existed Water tower: Never existed

History
- Former names: Klanin
Location

Kłanino is a no longer operational PKP railway station in Kłanino (Pomeranian Voivodeship), Poland.

== Lines crossing the station ==
Start station	End station	Line type
Swarzewo	Krokowa	Closed/From Starzyński Dwór dismantled
