= Radoszewo railway station =

Railway station in Radoszewo, Poland

Coordinates: 54°45′56″N 18°16′26″E

Radoszewo
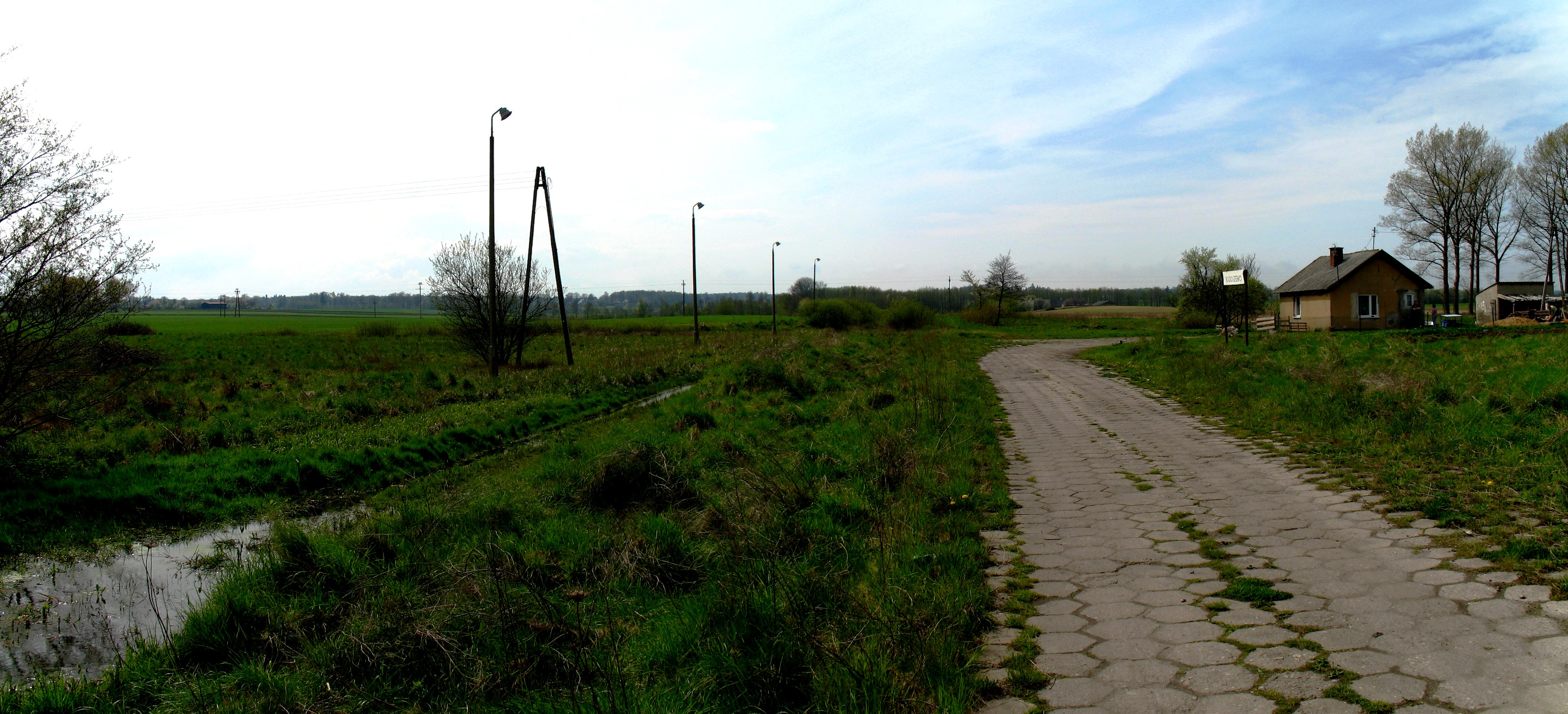

General information
- Location: Radoszewo; Poland
- Owner: Polskie Koleje Państwowe S.A.
- Platforms: None

Construction
- Structure type: Building: Yes (no longer used); Depot: Never existed Water tower: Never existed

History
- Former names: Reddischau
Location

Radoszewo is a defunct PKP railway station in Radoszewo (Pomeranian Voivodeship), Poland.

== Lines crossing the station ==
Start station	End station	Line type
Swarzewo	Krokowa	Closed/From Starzyński Dwór dismantled
