= Sławoszyno railway station =

Railway station in Sławoszyno, Poland

Coordinates: 54°47′04″N 18°11′58″E

Sławoszyno

General information
- Location: Sławoszyno; Poland
- Owner: Polskie Koleje Państwowe S.A.
- Platforms: 1

Construction
- Structure type: Building: Never existed Depot: Never existed Water tower: Never existed

History
- Former names: Wittenbrock
Location

Sławoszyno is a no longer operational PKP railway station in Sławoszyno (Pomeranian Voivodeship), Poland.

== Lines crossing the station ==
Start station	End station	Line type
Swarzewo	Krokowa	Closed/From Starzyński Dwór dismantled
