= Osłonino =

- Village
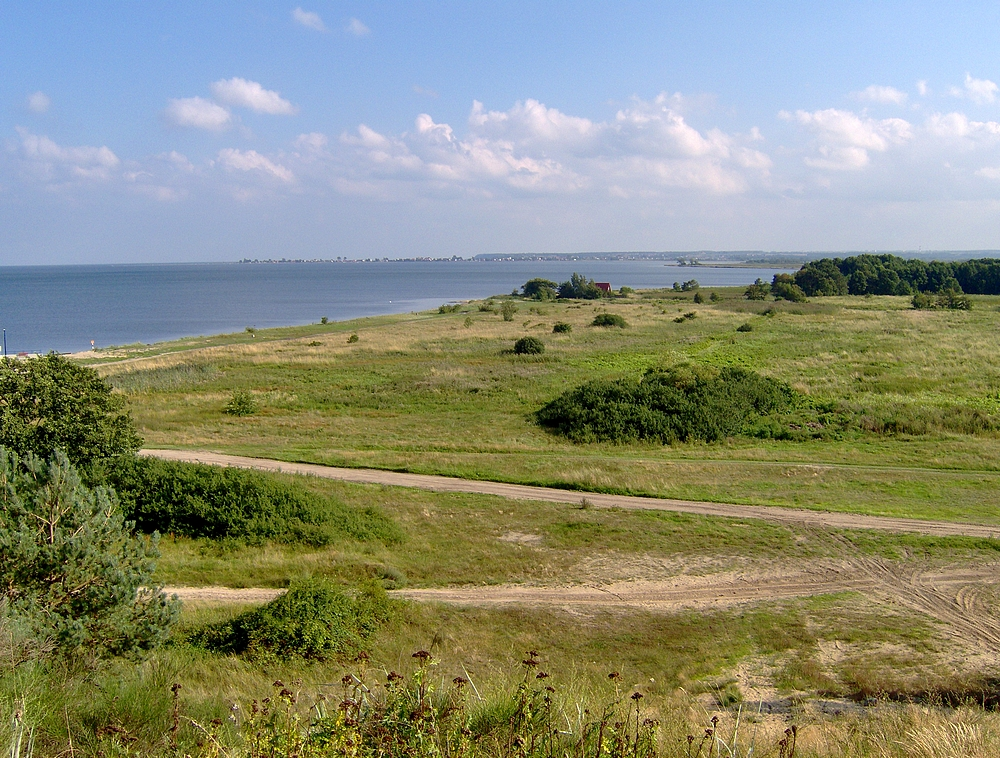

- Location within Poland
- Coordinates: 54°40′8″N 18°27′24″E
- Country: Poland
- Voivodeship: Pomeranian
- County: Puck
- Gmina: Puck
- Population: 350
- Time zone: UTC+1 (CET)
  - Summer (DST): UTC+2 (CEST)
- Vehicle registration: GPU

Osłonino ([ɔswɔˈninɔ]; German: Oslanin, 1942–45 Truchsassen) is a village in the administrative district of Gmina Puck, within Puck County, Pomeranian Voivodeship, in northern Poland. It is located at the mouth of the Gizdepka river on the Bay of Puck on the coast of the Baltic Sea in the historic region of Pomerania.

== History ==
During the German occupation of Poland (World War II), in 1939 and 1942, the occupiers carried out expulsions of Poles, whose houses were handed over to ethnic Germans as part of the Lebensraum policy. Some of the expelled Poles were deported to forced labour.

== Notable residents ==
- Hilmar Kopper (born 1935), former chairman of Deutsche Bank
