= Łebcz railway station =

Railway station in Łebcz, Poland

Coordinates: 54°46′10″N 18°20′16″E

Łebcz
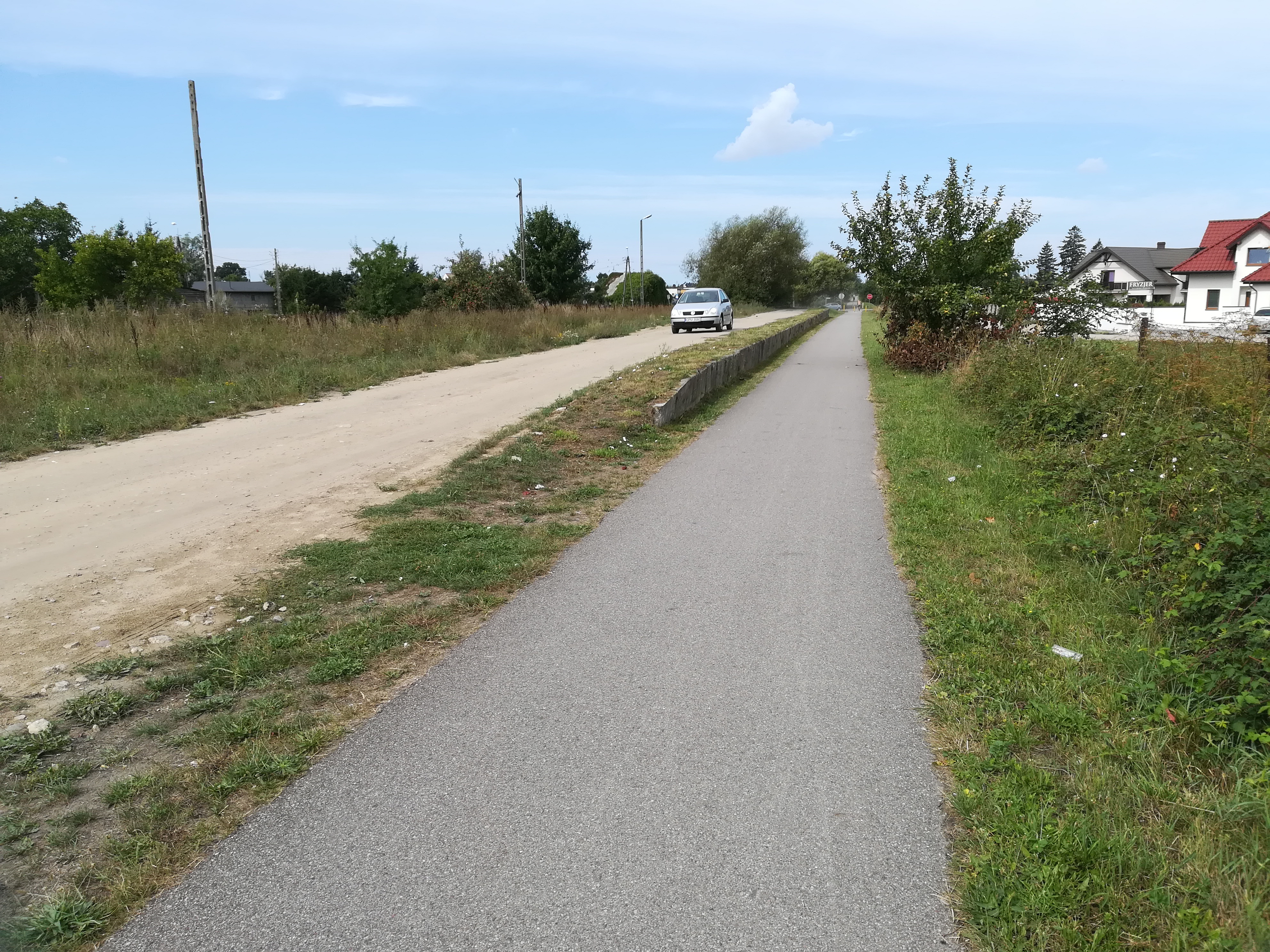
- An image of Łebcz railway station

General information
- Location: Łebcz; Poland
- Owner: Polskie Koleje Państwowe S.A.
- Platforms: 1

Construction
- Structure type: Building: Never existed Depot: Never existed Water tower: Never existed

History
- Former names: Löbsch
Location

Łebcz is a no longer operational PKP railway station in Łebcz (Pomeranian Voivodeship), Poland.

== Lines crossing the station ==
Start station	End station	Line type
Swarzewo	Krokowa	Closed
