= Starzyński Dwór =

- Village
- Location within Poland
- Coordinates: 54°45′37″N 18°17′29″E
- Country: Poland
- Voivodeship: Pomeranian
- County: Puck
- Gmina: Puck
- Population: 347

Starzyński Dwór ([staˈʐɨɲski ˈdvur]; German: Klein Starsin, 1942–45 Kleinstarsen) is a village in the administrative district of Gmina Puck, within Puck County, Pomeranian Voivodeship, in northern Poland.

It used to have a railway station on the now-dismantled Swarzewo to Krokowa branch line.

For details of the history of the region, see History of Pomerania.
