= Kłanino Palace =

Coordinates: 54°45′50″N 18°14′49″E

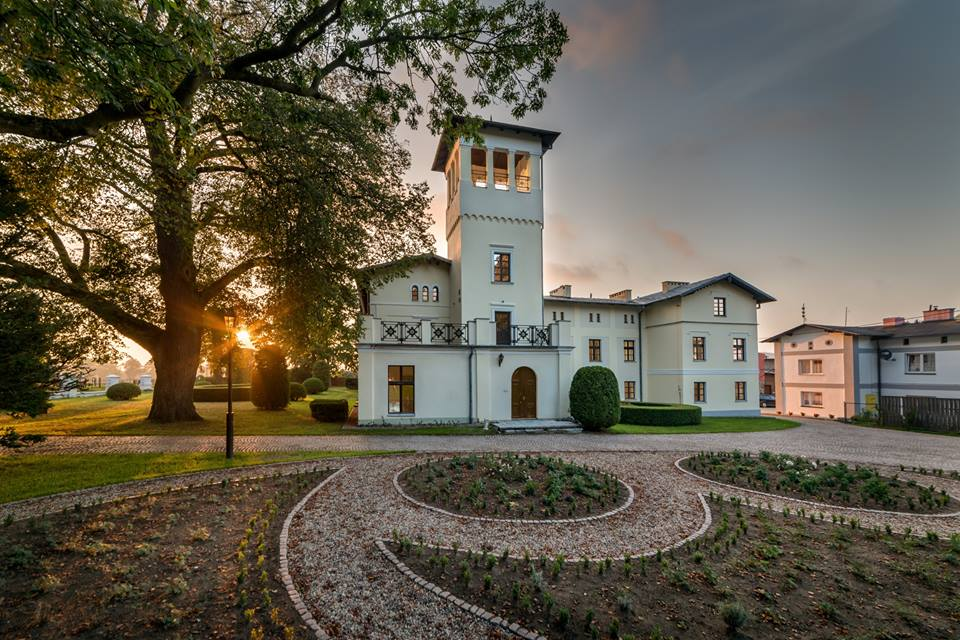
- Kłanino Palace
- Interactive map of the Kłanino Palace area

General information
- Architectural style: Eclecticism
- Location: Kłanino, Poland
- Construction started: 15th century. Major construction 19th century
- Completed: 17th century

Kłanino Palace (Polish: Pałac w Kłaninie) - a palace located in the village of Kłanino, Gmina Krokowa, Puck County, Pomeranian Voivodeship; in Poland. Currently, the palace is used as a hotel and restaurant.
