= Hilmar Kopper =

German banker (1935–2021)

- Born: 13 March 1935; Osłonino, Pomeranian Voivodeship, Poland
- Died: 11 November 2021 (aged 86)
- Occupation: Banker
- Organizations: Deutsche Bank

Hilmar Kopper (13 March 1935 – 11 November 2021) was a German banker, and former chairman of the Board of Deutsche Bank (1989–1997).

== Life and career ==
Kopper was born in Osłonino in the Pomeranian Voivodeship of (Poland), the second of four children of a Mennonite family. His family was expelled after World War II.

As the family could afford academic education only for one child, Kopper's elder brother, he became a trainee at Deutsche Bank in 1954, at a regional branch named Rheinisch-Westfälische Bank in Köln-Mülheim. He would spend his whole career at the bank. He was sent to the J. Henry Schroder Banking Corp. in New York City, and then worked in Deutsche Bank's department for foreign affairs (Auslandsabteilung in Düsseldorf. In 1972, he became a member of the board of the Deutsch-Asiatische Bank AG (German-Asian Bank). He was promoted to General Representative (Generalbevollmächtigter) in 1972, and became a board member in 1977. After the terrorist murder of Alfred Herrhausen, the bank's chief executive, in 1989, he succeeded him as chairman (Vorstandssprecher). During his tenure, the bank was redesigned to become a global player. He held the position until 1997, and then was chairman of the supervisory board until 2002.

Kopper chaired the supervisory board of DaimlerChrysler from 1998 to 2007. He was a former member of the Steering Committee of the Bilderberg Group. He was also a jury member of the Franz Werfel Human Rights Award.

=== Controversy ===
Kopper received widespread public and media attention in 1994, when he used the word "peanuts" to describe a sum of DM 50 million. A jury of linguistic scholars subsequently voted the term as German Un-word of the year, thus criticizing the widely differing definitions of a non-notable amount of money by bank managers and average people. With some self-irony, Kopper posed on a heap of peanuts for advertisement of Frankfurter Allgemeine Zeitung ("Dahinter steckt immer ein kluger Kopf, or "There is always a clever mind behind it").

=== Private life ===
During Kopper's time as a trainee in the U.S., he met the author Ernest Hemingway by chance on a beach in Acapulco, Mexico, in 1958 and remained a life-long fan of his books. He married his first wife, Irene, in 1961. One of the couple's three children is the historian Christopher Kopper. They separated in 1999. Since 2003, Kopper was married to Brigitte Seebacher, the widow of Willy Brandt.

Kopper died after a short severe illness at age 86.

== Publications ==
- Kopper, Hilmar (1997). Die Bank lebt nicht vom Geld allein : Beiträge zu Kultur und Gesellschaft 1994–1997 (in German). München: Piper. ISBN 3-492-22584-5. OCLC 45050456.
