= Gizdepka =

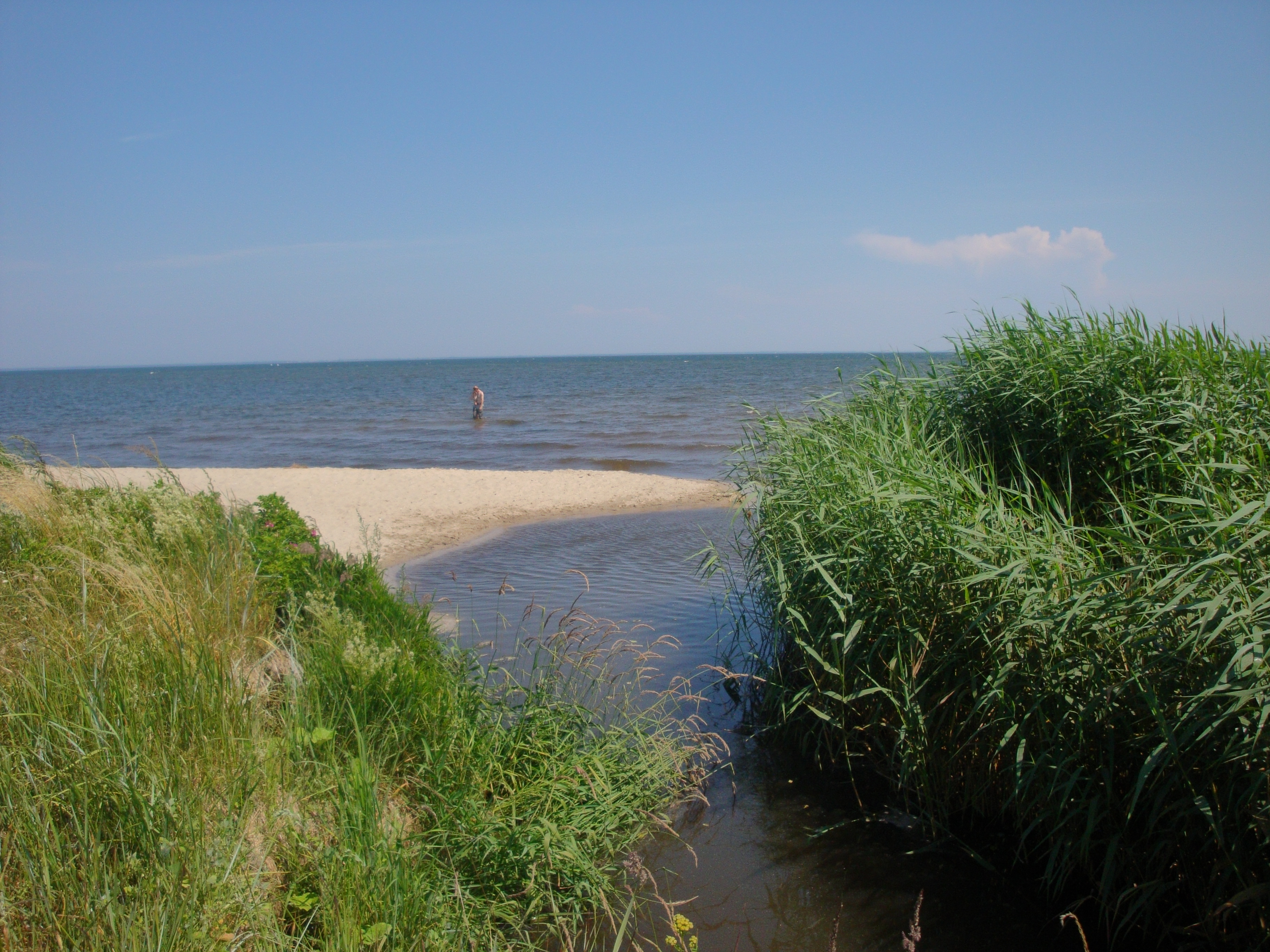

Location
- Country: Poland

Physical characteristics
- Mouth
  - location: Bay of Puck
  - coordinates: 54.6659°N 18.4665°E

Gizdepka is a river of Poland. It flows into the Bay of Puck at Osłonino.
