= Łebcz =

- Village
- Location within Poland
- Coordinates: 54°46′5″N 18°20′8″E
- Country: Poland
- Voivodeship: Pomeranian
- County: Puck
- Gmina: Puck
- Population: 2,024

Łebcz ([wɛpt͡ʂ]; German: Löbsch) is a village in the administrative district of Gmina Puck, within Puck County, Pomeranian Voivodeship, in northern Poland. It once had a railway station, the Łebcz railway station.

== See also ==
- History of Pomerania
