= Płutnica =

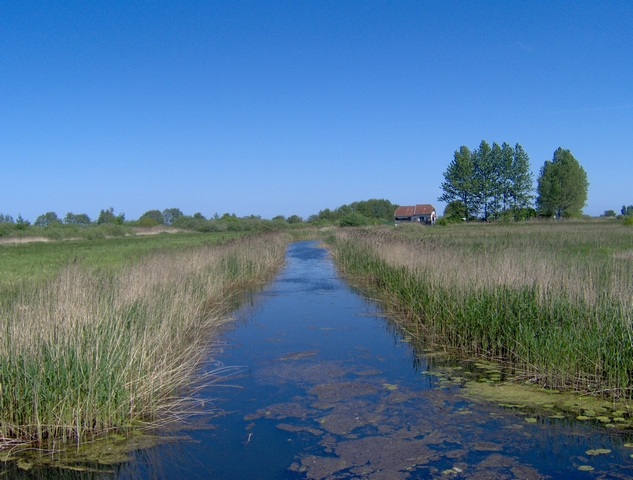

Location
- Country: Poland

Physical characteristics
- Mouth
  - location: Bay of Puck
  - coordinates: 54°43′40″N 18°23′51″E

Płutnica is a river of Poland. It leads to the Bay of Puck above the town of Puck.
