= Kłanino, Pomeranian Voivodeship =

Kłanino
- Village
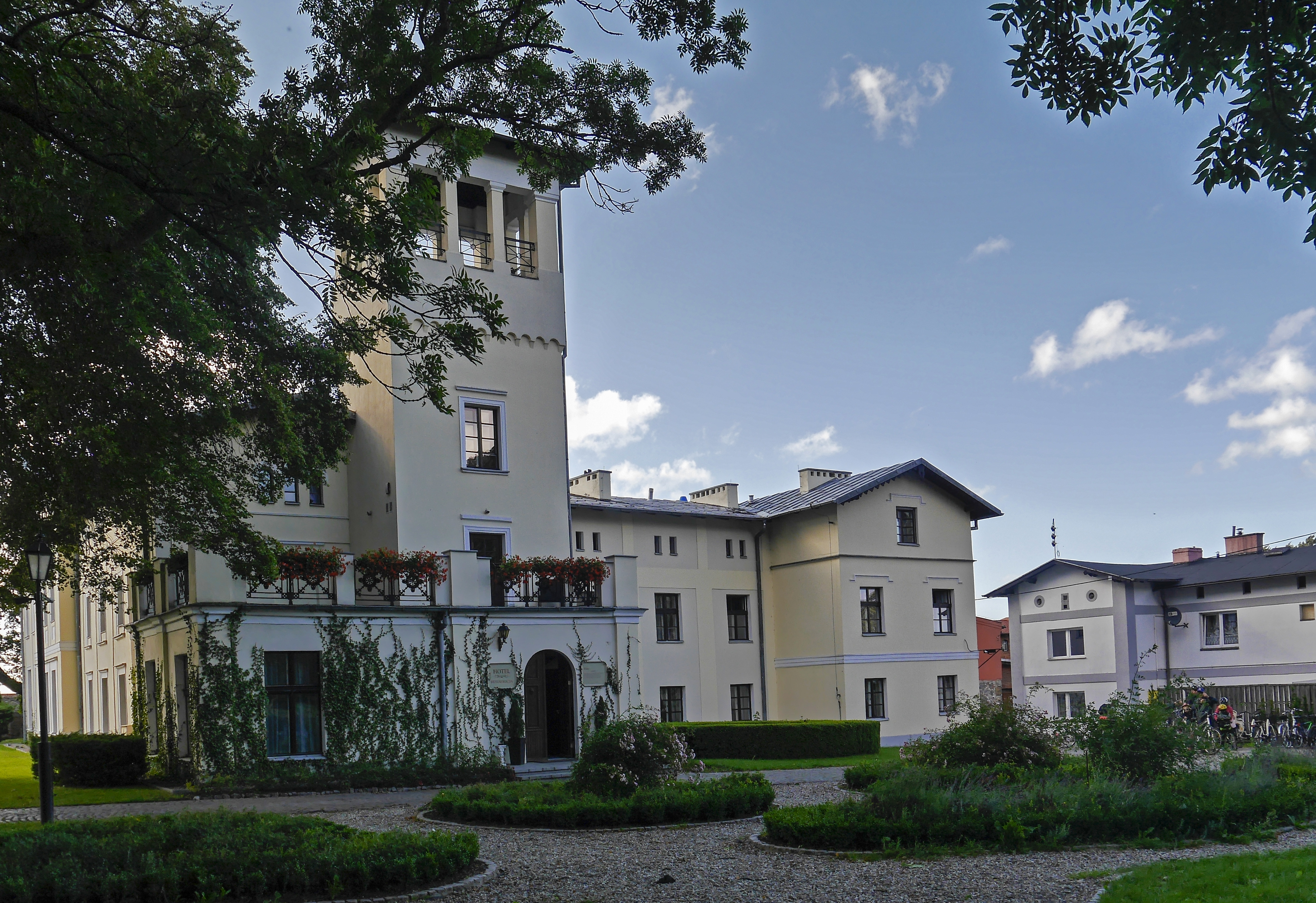
- Kłanino Palace

- Location within Poland
- Coordinates: 54°45′45″N 18°14′39″E
- Country: Poland
- Voivodeship: Pomeranian
- County: Puck
- Gmina: Krokowa

Population
  - Total: 383
- Time zone: UTC+1 (CET)
  - Summer (DST): UTC+2 (CEST)
- Vehicle registration: GPU

Kłanino [kwaˈninɔ] is a village in the administrative district of Gmina Krokowa, within Puck County, Pomeranian Voivodeship, in northern Poland.

Kłanino was a private village of Polish nobility, including the Marcelecz, Wibasz, Kliński and Lubocki families, administratively located in the Puck County in the Pomeranian Voivodeship of the Kingdom of Poland.

Sights of Kłanino are the Kłanino Palace and the Armory Museum (Muzeum Pancerne) with a collection of armory from World War II.
