= Radoszewo =

- Village
- Location within Poland
- Coordinates: 54°46′14″N 18°16′22″E
- Country: Poland
- Voivodeship: Pomeranian
- County: Puck
- Gmina: Puck
- Population: 202

Radoszewo ([radɔˈʂɛvɔ]; German: Reddischau) is a village in the administrative district of Gmina Puck, within Puck County, Pomeranian Voivodeship, in northern Poland.

== See also ==
- History of Pomerania
