= Bay of Puck =

- Zatoka Pucka (Polish)
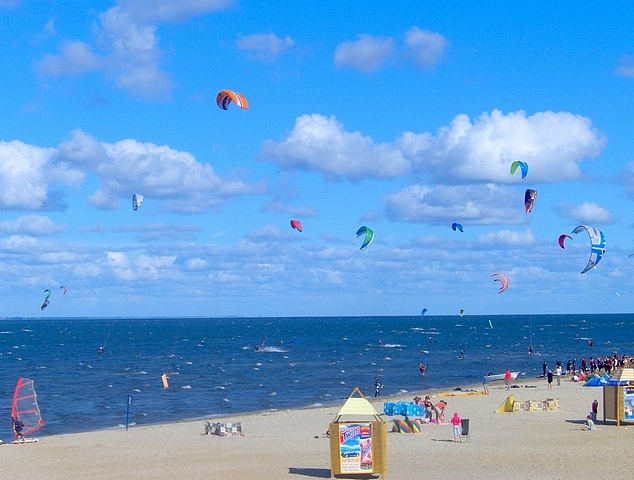
- Beach in Puck, with kitesurfers

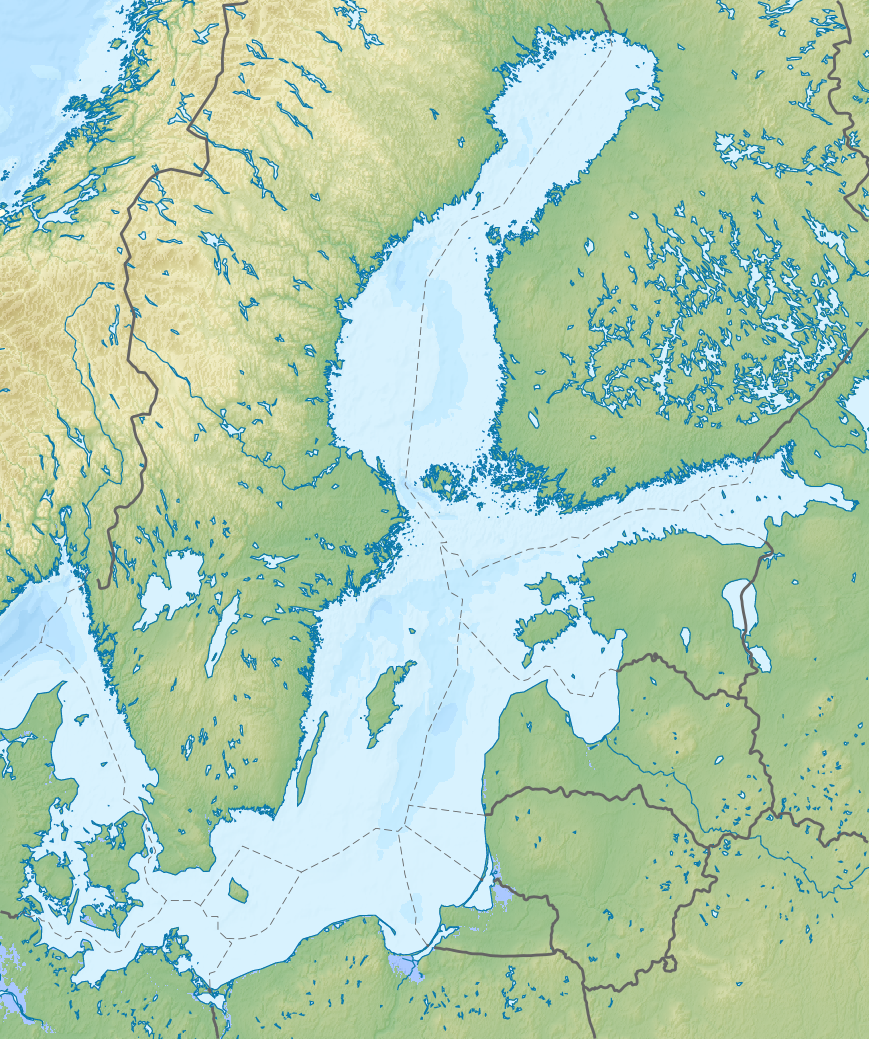
- Location within Poland Location within Baltic Sea

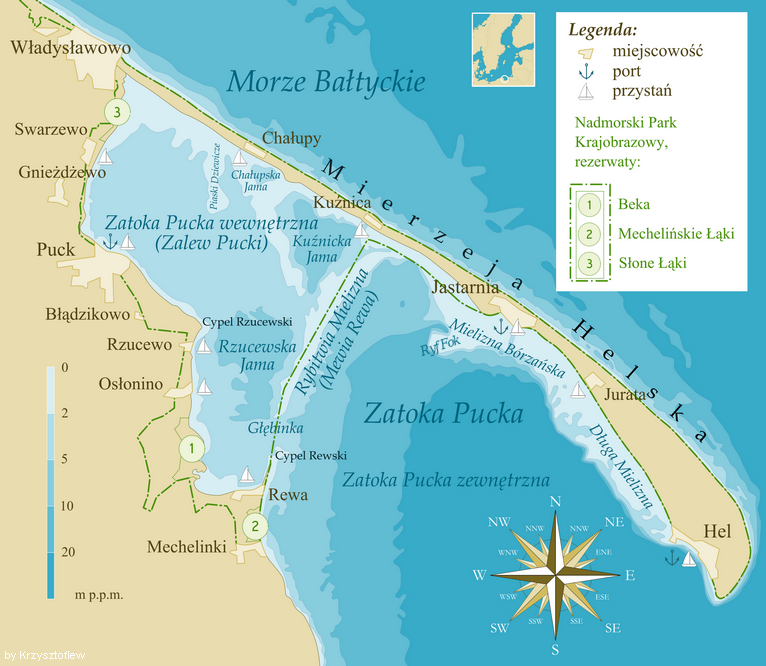
- Puck Bay, with inner shallow
- Location: Poland
- Coordinates: 54.6667°N 18.5833°E
- Type: Bay
- Etymology: Puck
- Part of: Bay of Gdańsk
- Surface area: 364 km^{2} (141 sq mi)
- Max. depth: 55 m (180 ft)
- Settlements: Puck; Jastarnia; Hel; Władysławowo

The Bay of Puck or Puck Bay (Polish: Zatoka Pucka; Kashubian: Pùckô Hôwinga; German: Putziger Wiek), is a shallow western branch of the Bay of Gdańsk in the southern Baltic Sea, off the shores of Gdańsk Pomerania, Poland. The Hel Peninsula separates the bay from the open sea.

The bay has an average depth of 2 m (7 ft) to 6 m (20 ft). There is a shallow sand-bank from Rewa to Kuźnica in the middle of Hel Peninsula. The bay is available only for small fishing-boats and yachts, which have to stick to the strict deeper routes. There are deposits of potassium salt below the Bay of Puck. The main ports are Puck, Jastarnia, and Hel.

The placename Puck (Polish pronunciation: [put͡sk] has nothing to do with the sport of ice hockey. In Polish the word "puck" doesn't mean anything, and the sport is popular only in the southern part of the country, opposite the coast.

Location along Baltic Sea coast

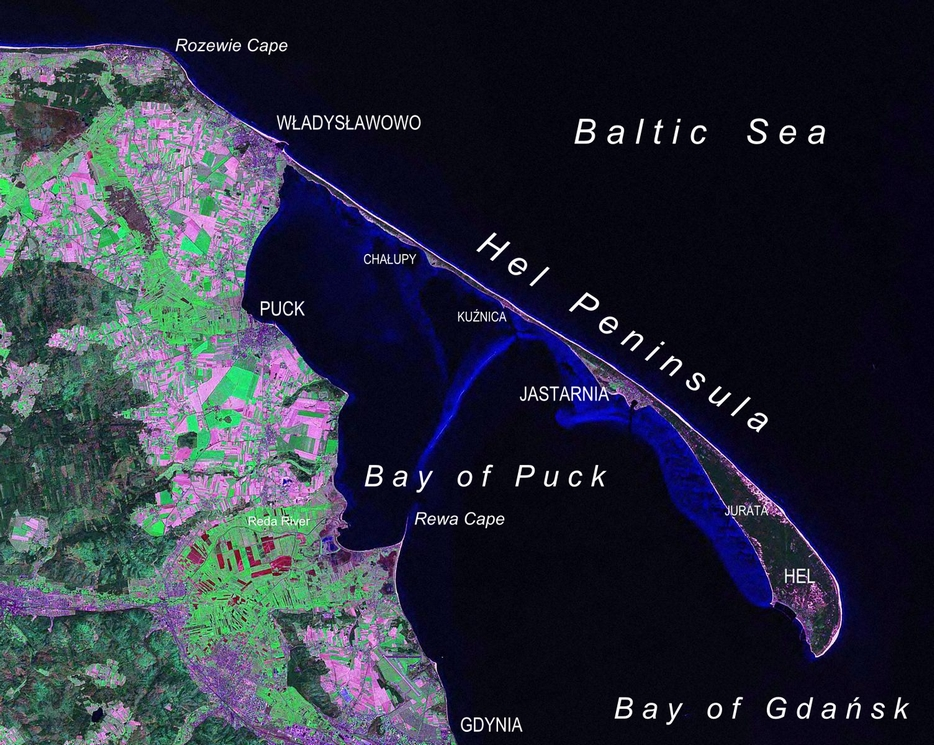
Bay of Puck and Hel Peninsula as seen from Landsat satellite in 2000

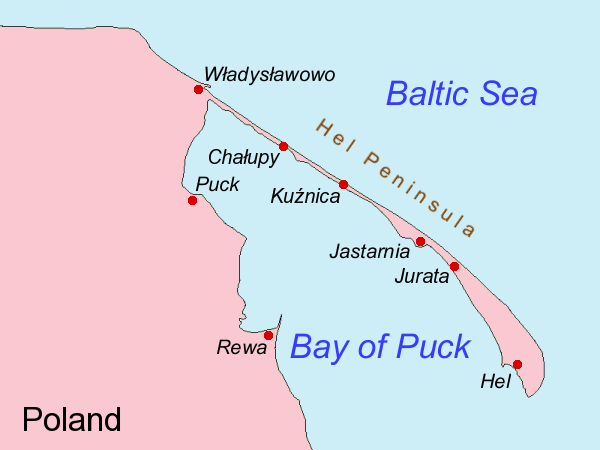
Towns of Puck Bay and Hel Peninsula

== Geography ==
=== Rivers ===
- Gizdepka
- Płutnica

== See also ==
- Bays of Poland
- Special Protection Areas in Poland
- Natura 2000 in Poland
