= Swarzewo =

- Village
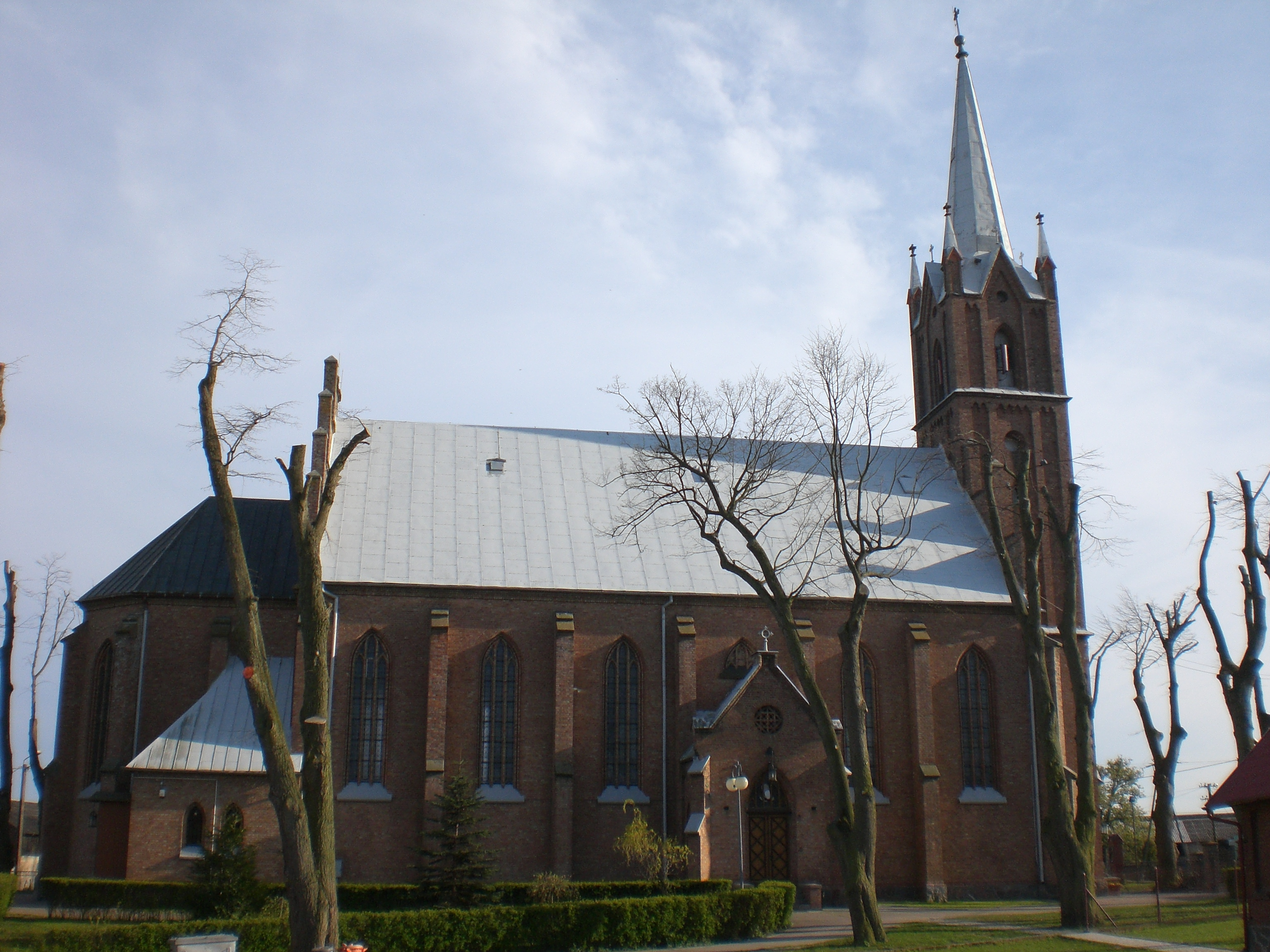
- Church of the Nativity of the Virgin Mary in Swarzewo

- Location within Poland
- Coordinates: 54°45′31″N 18°23′47″E
- Country: Poland
- Voivodeship: Pomeranian
- County: Puck
- Gmina: Puck
- Population: 988
- Time zone: UTC+1 (CET)
  - Summer (DST): UTC+2 (CEST)
- Vehicle registration: GPU

Swarzewo ([sfaˈʐɛvɔ]; German: Schwarzau) is a village in the administrative district of Gmina Puck, within Puck County, Pomeranian Voivodeship, in northern Poland. It is located on the Bay of Puck within the historic region of Pomerania.

== History ==
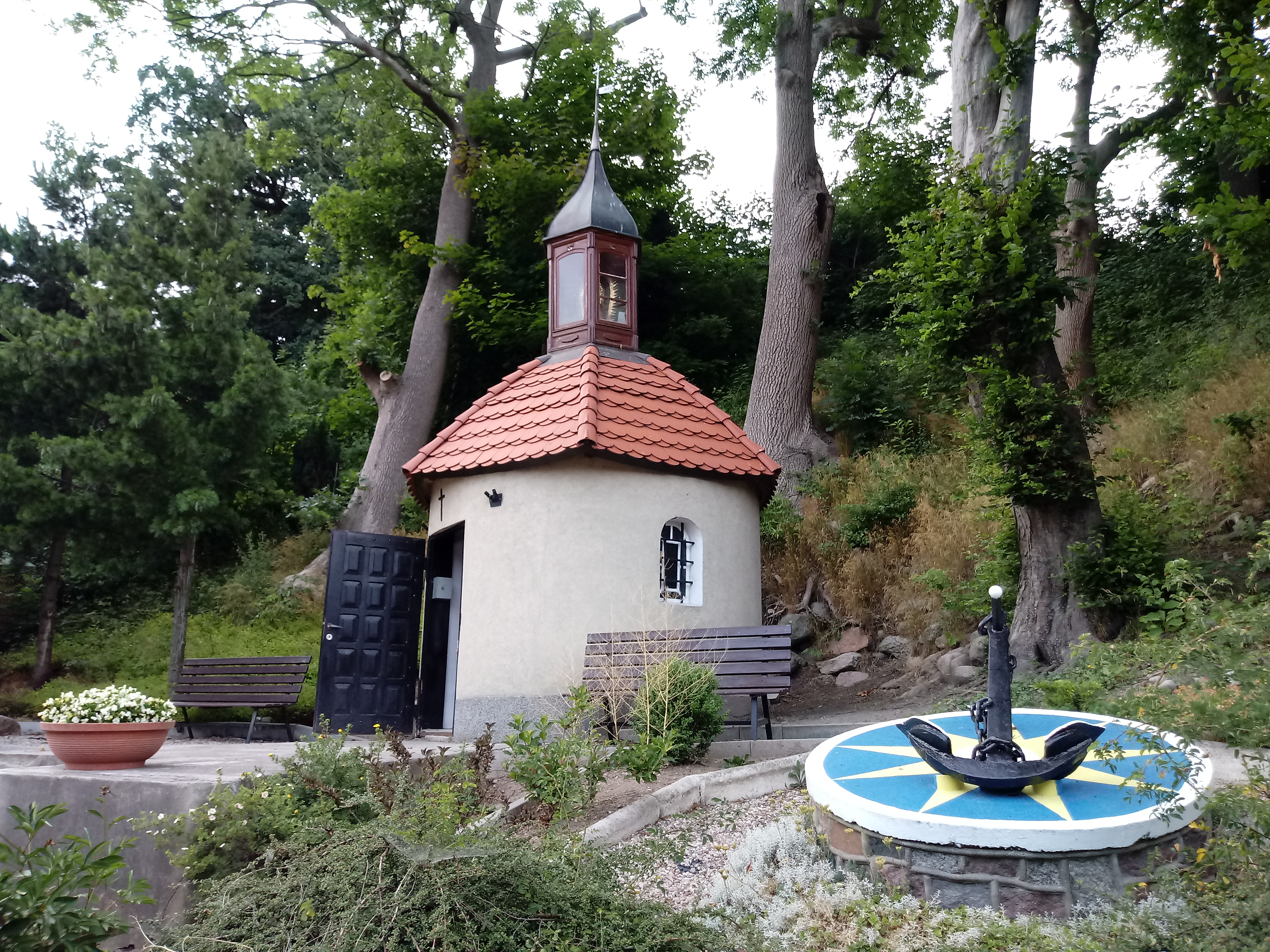
18th-century Chapel of Our Lady

Swarzewo was a royal village of the Polish Crown, administratively located in Puck County in the Pomeranian Voivodeship.

During the German occupation of Poland (World War II), Swarzewo was one of the sites of executions of Poles, carried out by the Germans in 1939 as part of the Intelligenzaktion, and in 1942 the Germans expelled several Polish families, whose farms were then handed over to German colonists as part of the Lebensraum policy. The expelled Poles were enslaved as forced labour to serve Germans in other villages in the region.
