= Starzyński Dwór railway station =

Railway station in Starzyński Dwór, Poland

Coordinates: 54°45′52″N 18°18′18″E

Starzyński Dwór
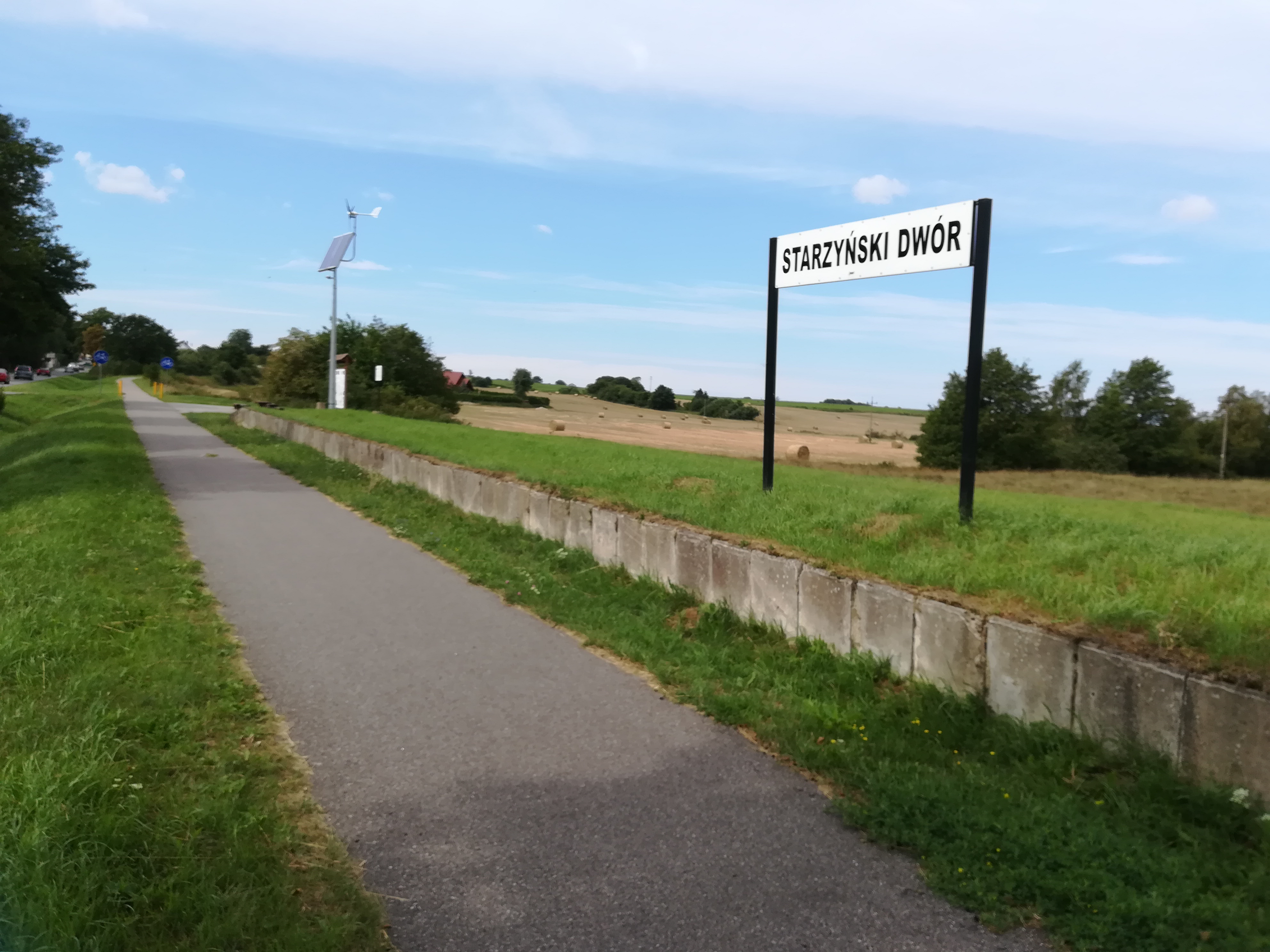
- An image of Starzyński Dwór railway station

General information
- Location: Starzyński Dwór; Poland
- Owner: Polskie Koleje Państwowe S.A.
- Platforms: 1

Construction
- Structure type: Building: Never existed Depot: Never existed Water tower: Pulled down

History
- Former names: Kleine Starsin
Location

Starzyński Dwór is a no longer operational PKP railway station in Starzyński Dwór (Pomeranian Voivodeship), Poland.

== Lines crossing the station ==
Start station	End station	Line type
Swarzewo	Krokowa	Closed/From Starzyński Dwór dismantled
