= Krokowa railway station =

Railway station in Krokowa, Poland

Coordinates: 54°46′55″N 18°09′53″E

Krokowa
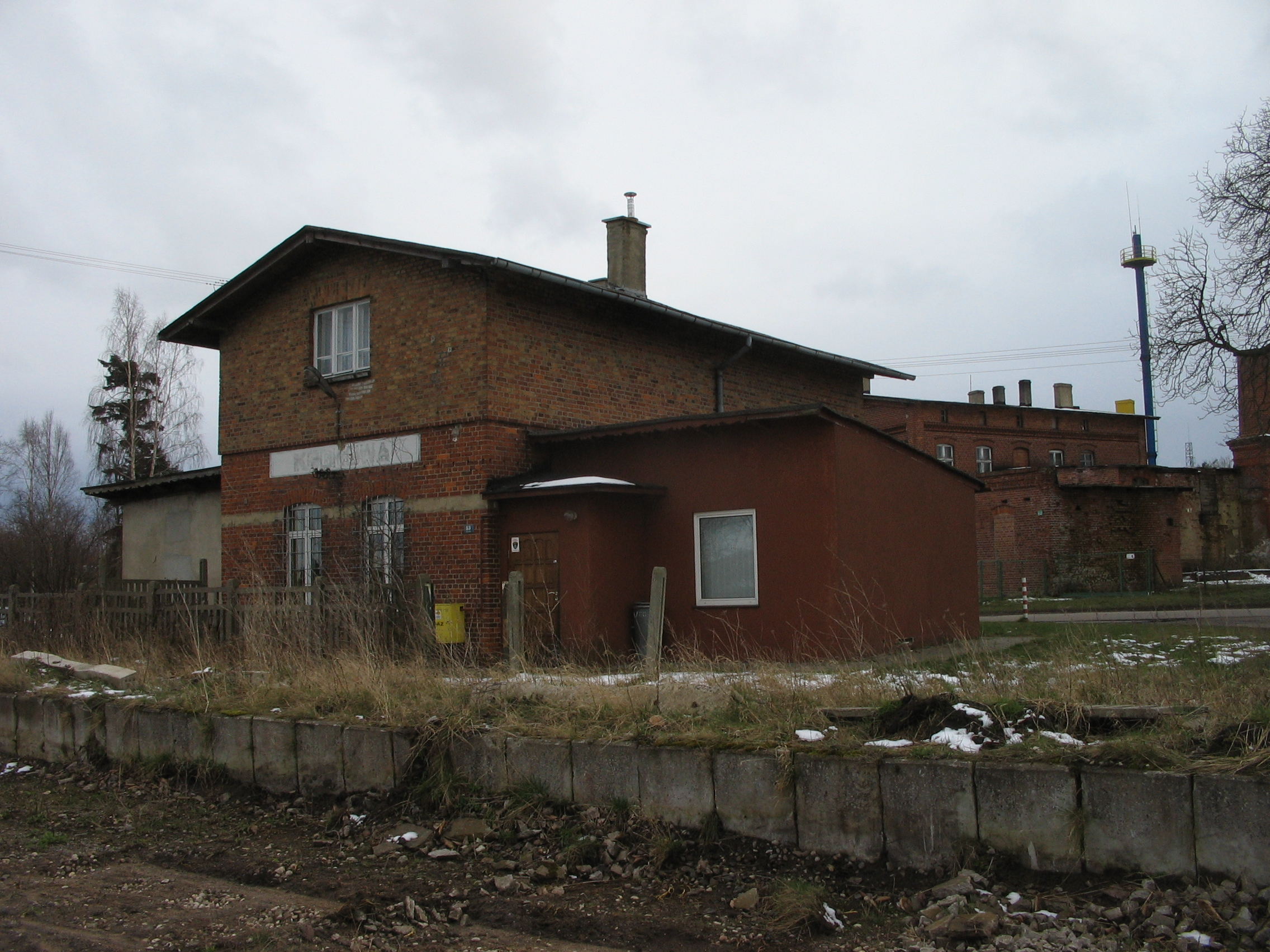

General information
- Location: Krokowa; Poland
- Owner: Polskie Koleje Państwowe S.A.
- Platforms: 1

Construction
- Structure type: Building: Yes (no longer used); Depot: Pulled down Water tower: Never existed

History
- Former names: Krockow
Location

Krokowa is a no longer operational PKP railway station in Krokowa (Pomeranian Voivodeship), Poland.

== Lines crossing the station ==
Start station	End station	Line type
Swarzewo	Krokowa	Closed/From Starzyński Dwór dismantled
