= Krokowa =

- Village
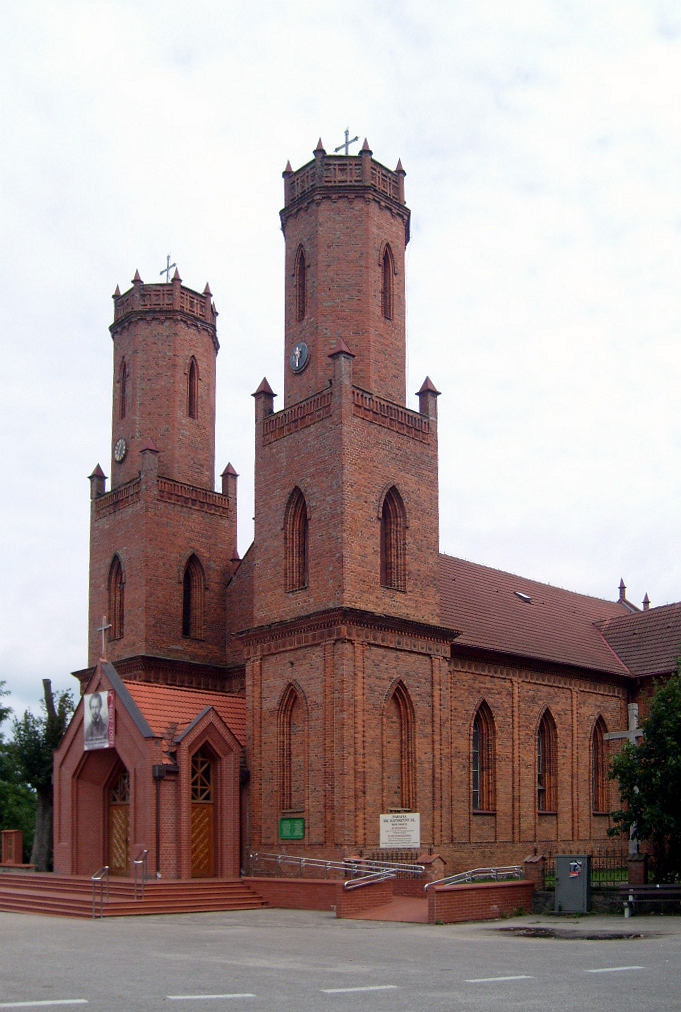
- Saint Catherine of Alexandria Church

- Coat of arms

- Location within Poland
- Coordinates: 54°46′50″N 18°9′35″E
- Country: Poland
- Voivodeship: Pomeranian
- County: Puck
- Gmina: Krokowa
- Population: 3,500

Krokowa [krɔˈkɔva] is a village in Puck County, Pomeranian Voivodeship, in northern Poland. It is the seat of the gmina (administrative district) called Gmina Krokowa.

For details of the history of the region, see History of Pomerania.
