= Swarzewo railway station =

Railway station in Gnieżdżewo, Poland

Coordinates: 54.7539°N 18.3744°E

Swarzewo
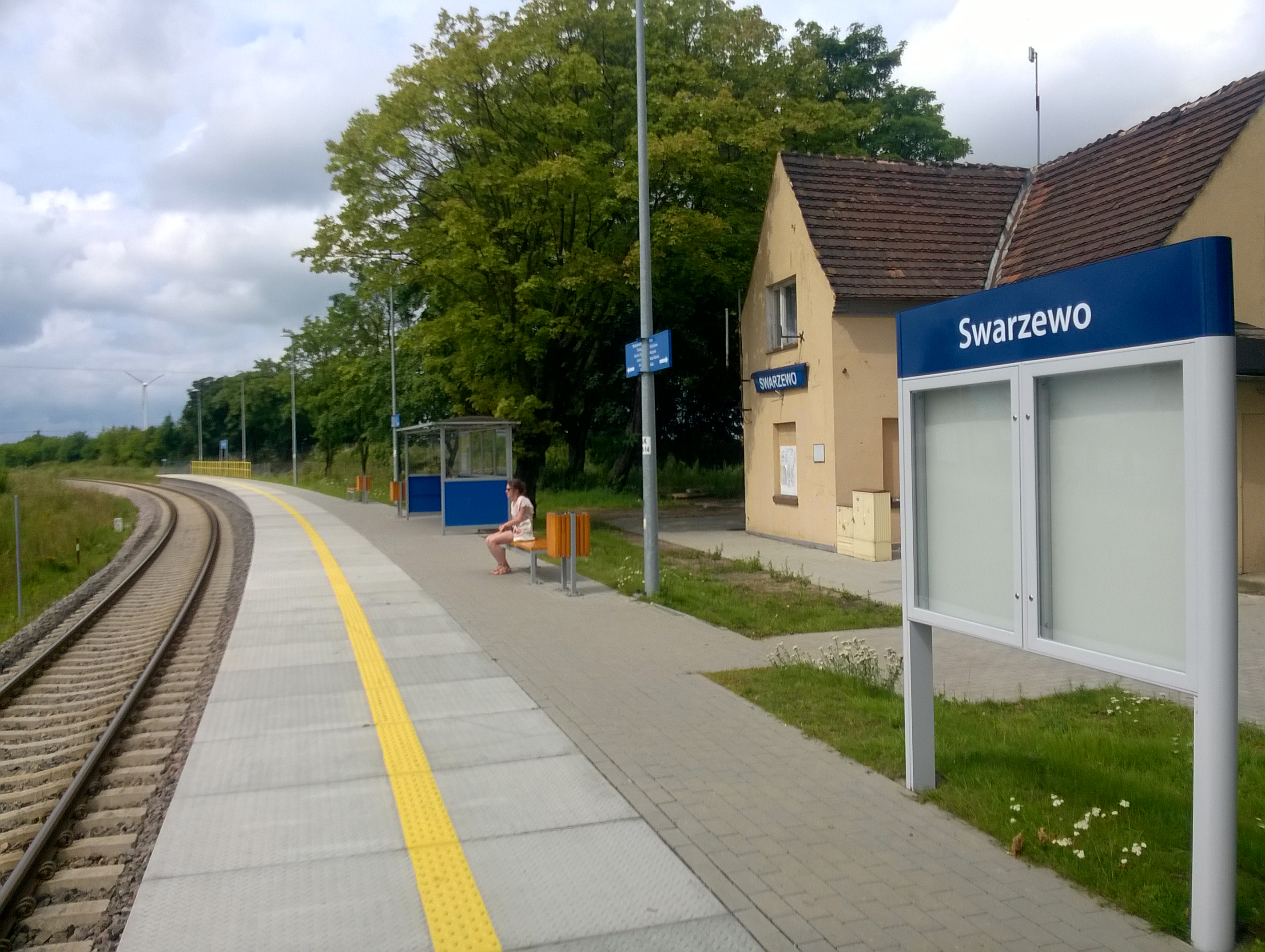
- Swarzewo railway station

General information
- Location: Swarzewo, Pomeranian Voivodeship; Poland
- System: Railway Station
- Operator: PKP Polskie Linie Kolejowe
- Line: 213: Reda–Hel railway
- Platforms: 1
- Tracks: 1

History
- Opened: 1903; 123 years ago
- Rebuilt: 2014
Location
- Location within Poland

Swarzewo railway station is a railway stop serving the village of Swarzewo, in the Pomeranian Voivodeship, Poland. The station opened in 1903 and is located on the Reda–Hel railway. The train services are operated by Polregio.

The station used to be known as Schwarzau (Westpreußen). The station used to be located on the Swarzewo–Krokowa railway which was dismantled in 2005 after losing passenger traffic in 1989 and freight traffic in 1991.

== Modernisation ==
The station was rebuilt in 2014 as part of the modernisation of the Reda–Hel railway.

== Train services ==
The station is served by the following services:

- Regional services (R) Władysławowo - Reda - Gdynia Główna
- Regional services (R) Hel - Władysławowo - Reda - Gdynia Główna

During the summer months long-distance services also operate to/from Hel.

Preceding station	Polregio	Following station
Władysławowo towards Władysławowo or Hel	PR	Puck towards Gdynia Główna
