= Lischnitz =

Lischnitz may refer to the following places:

- in the Czech Republic:
  - Lischnitz, the German name for Lišnice, a village in Most District
  - Lischnitz, the German name for Líšnice (Ústí nad Orlicí District), a village in Ústí nad Orlicí District
  - Lischnitz, the German name for Líšnice u Prahy, a village in Prague-West District
- in Poland:
  - Lischnitz, the German name for Leśnice, a village in Lębork County
  - Ober Lischnitz, the German name for Dziechlino, a village in Lębork County
