= Tawęcino railway station =

Railway station in Tawęcino, Poland

Tawęcino

General information
- Location: Tawęcino; Poland
- Coordinates: 54.655073°N 17.795235°E
- Owner: Polskie Koleje Państwowe S.A.

Construction
- Structure type: Building: Never existed Depot: Never existed Water tower: Never existed

History
- Former names: Tauenzin until 1945
Location

Tawęcino is a non-operational PKP railway station on the disused PKP rail line 230 in Tawęcino (Pomeranian Voivodeship), Poland.

== Lines crossing the station ==
Start station	End station	Line type
Wejherowo	Garczegorze	Closed
