= Tauentzien =

Tauentzien may refer to:

- Friedrich Bogislav von Tauentzien (1710–1791), Prussian general of the Seven Years' War
- Bogislav Friedrich Emanuel Graf Tauentzien von Wittenberg (1760–1824), Prussian general of the Napoleonic Wars and namesake of Tauentzienstraße in Berlin
- Tawęcino (German Tauentzien), a village in the Lębork County, Pomeranian Voivodeship, Poland
