= Obliwice railway station =

Railway station in Poland

Obliwice
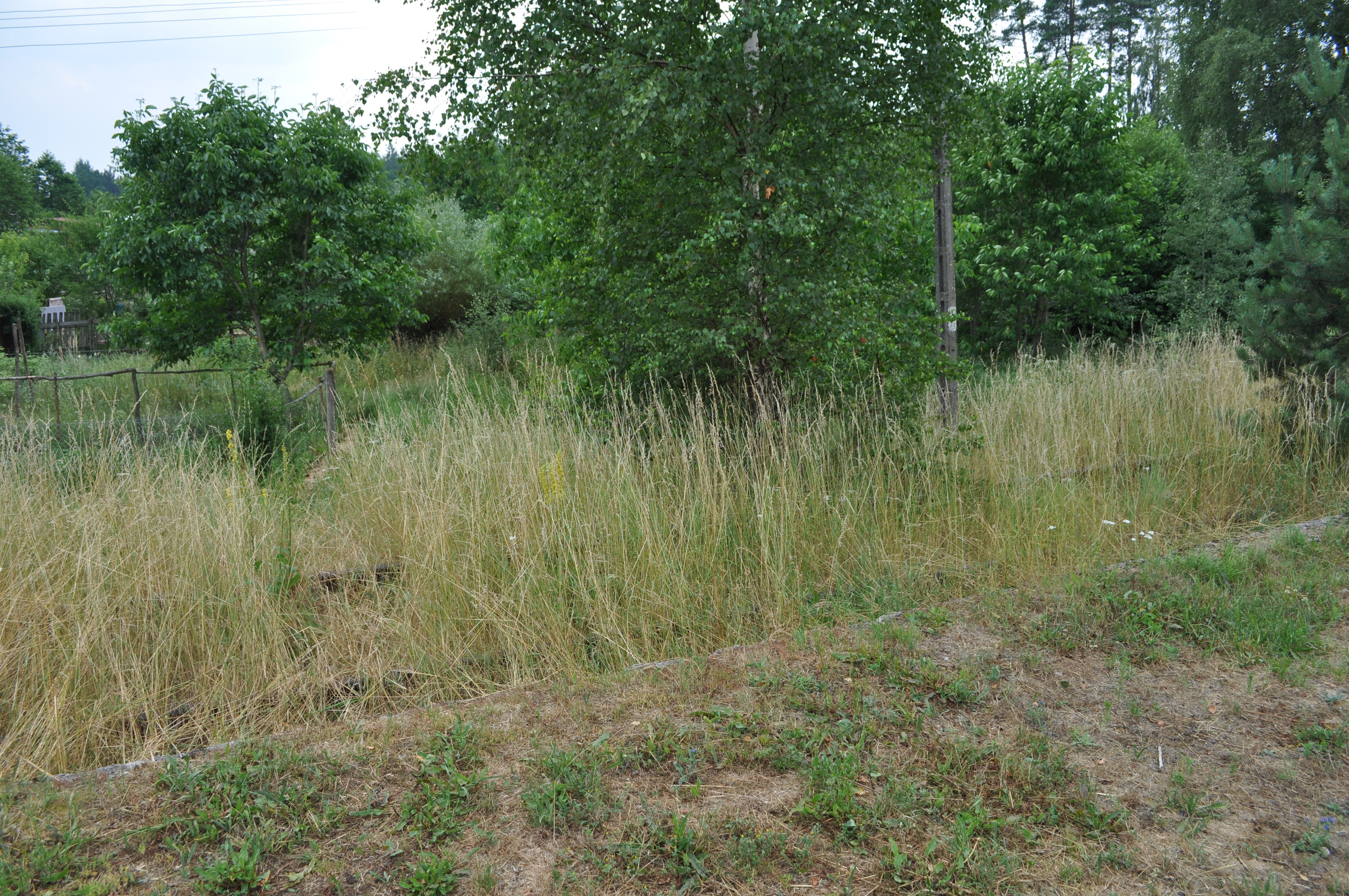

General information
- Location: Obliwice; Poland
- Coordinates: 54.610818°N 17.739895°E
- Owner: Polskie Koleje Państwowe S.A.

Construction
- Structure type: Building: No; Depot: No; Water tower: No

History
- Former names: /obliwitz until 1945
Location

Obliwice is a non-operational PKP railway station on the disused PKP rail line 230 in Obliwice (Pomeranian Voivodeship), Poland.

== Lines crossing the station ==
Start station	End station	Line type
Wejherowo	Garczegorze	Closed
