= Karlikowo railway station =

Railway station in Poland

Karlikowo

General information
- Location: Karlikowo Lęborskie; Poland
- Coordinates: 54.642663°N 17.787258°E
- Owner: Polskie Koleje Państwowe S.A.

Construction
- Structure type: Building: No; Depot: No; Water tower: No

History
- Former names: Karlkow (Kr. Lauenburg) until 1945
Location

Karlikowo is a dismantled former PKP railway station on the disused PKP rail line 230 in Karlikowo Lęborskie (Pomeranian Voivodeship), Poland.

== Lines crossing the station ==
Start station	End station	Line type
Wejherowo	Garczegorze	Closed
