= Rekowo Lęborskie railway station =

Railway station in Rekowo Lęborskie, Poland

Rekowo Lęborskie

General information
- Location: Rekowo Lęborskie; Poland
- Coordinates: 54.634266°N 17.784514°E
- Owner: Polskie Koleje Państwowe S.A.

Construction
- Structure type: Building: No; Depot: No; Water tower: No

History
- Former names: Reckow (Kr. Lauenburg) until 1945
Location

Rekowo Lęborskie is a non-operational PKP railway station on the disused PKP rail line 230 in Rekowo Lęborskie (Pomeranian Voivodeship), Poland.

== Lines crossing the station ==
Start station	End station	Line type
Wejherowo	Garczegorze	Closed
