= Janowiczki, Pomeranian Voivodeship =

Janowiczki
- Village
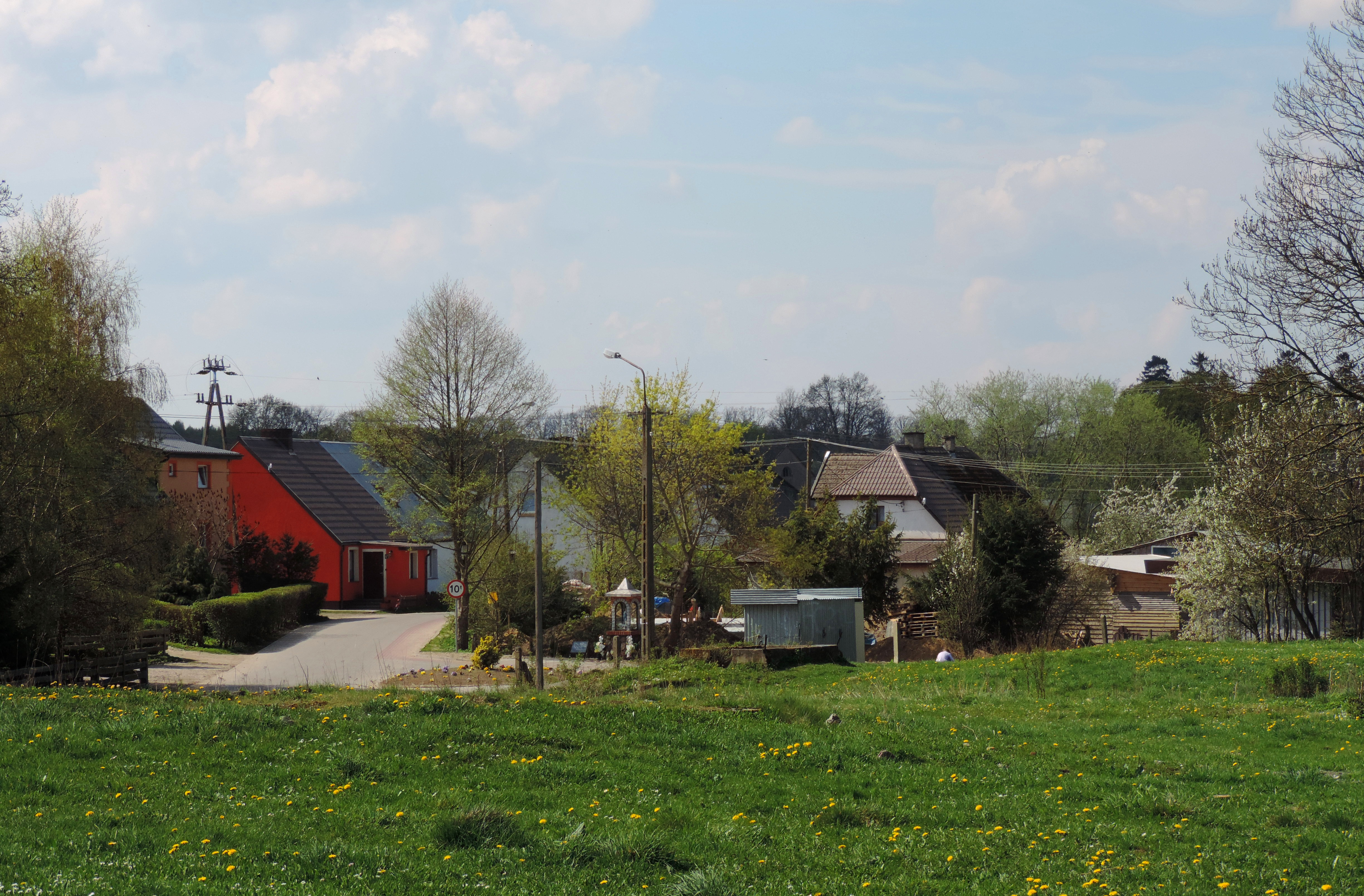

- Location within Poland
- Coordinates: 54°35′23″N 17°38′18″E
- Country: Poland
- Voivodeship: Pomeranian
- County: Lębork
- Gmina: Nowa Wieś Lęborska

Population
  - Total: 212
- Time zone: UTC+1 (CET)
  - Summer (DST): UTC+2 (CEST)
- Vehicle registration: GLE

Janowiczki [janɔˈvit͡ʂki] is a village in the administrative district of Gmina Nowa Wieś Lęborska, within Lębork County, Pomeranian Voivodeship, in northern Poland.

== History ==
Janowiczki was first recorded to be separated from the village of Janowice in 1398. It was possession of the Czapski family from 1739 to 1799, and then the von der Osten family from 1799 to 1945.
