= Darżewo, Pomeranian Voivodeship =

Darżewo
- Village
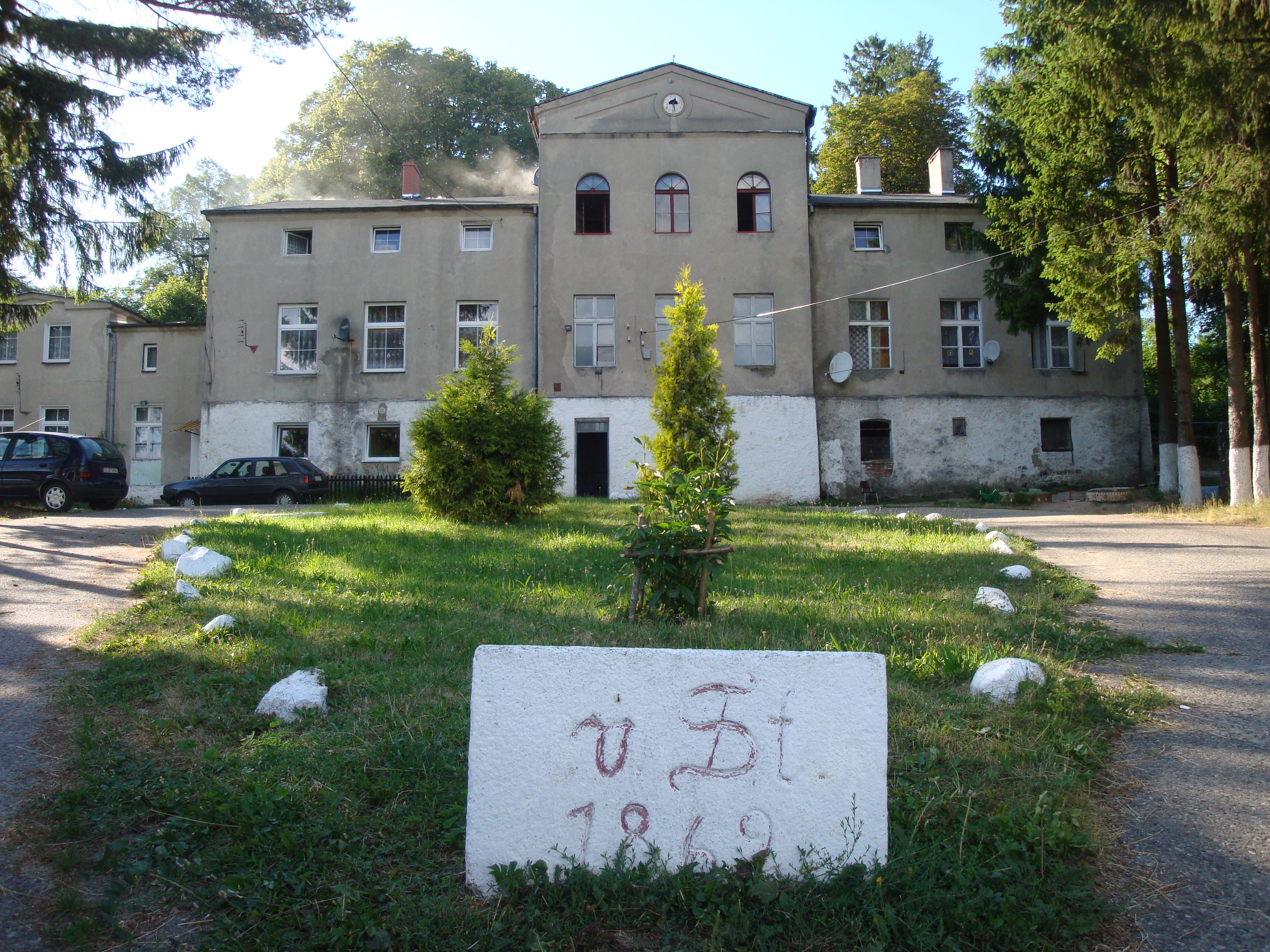
- Manor house in Darżewo

- Location within Poland
- Coordinates: 54°29′47″N 17°34′6″E
- Country: Poland
- Voivodeship: Pomeranian
- County: Lębork
- Gmina: Nowa Wieś Lęborska
- Population: 262

Darżewo [darˈʐɛvɔ] (German: Darsow) is a village in the administrative district of Gmina Nowa Wieś Lęborska, within Lębork County, Pomeranian Voivodeship, in northern Poland.

For details of the history of the region, see History of Pomerania.
