= Lesiaki, Pomeranian Voivodeship =

Lesiaki
- Village
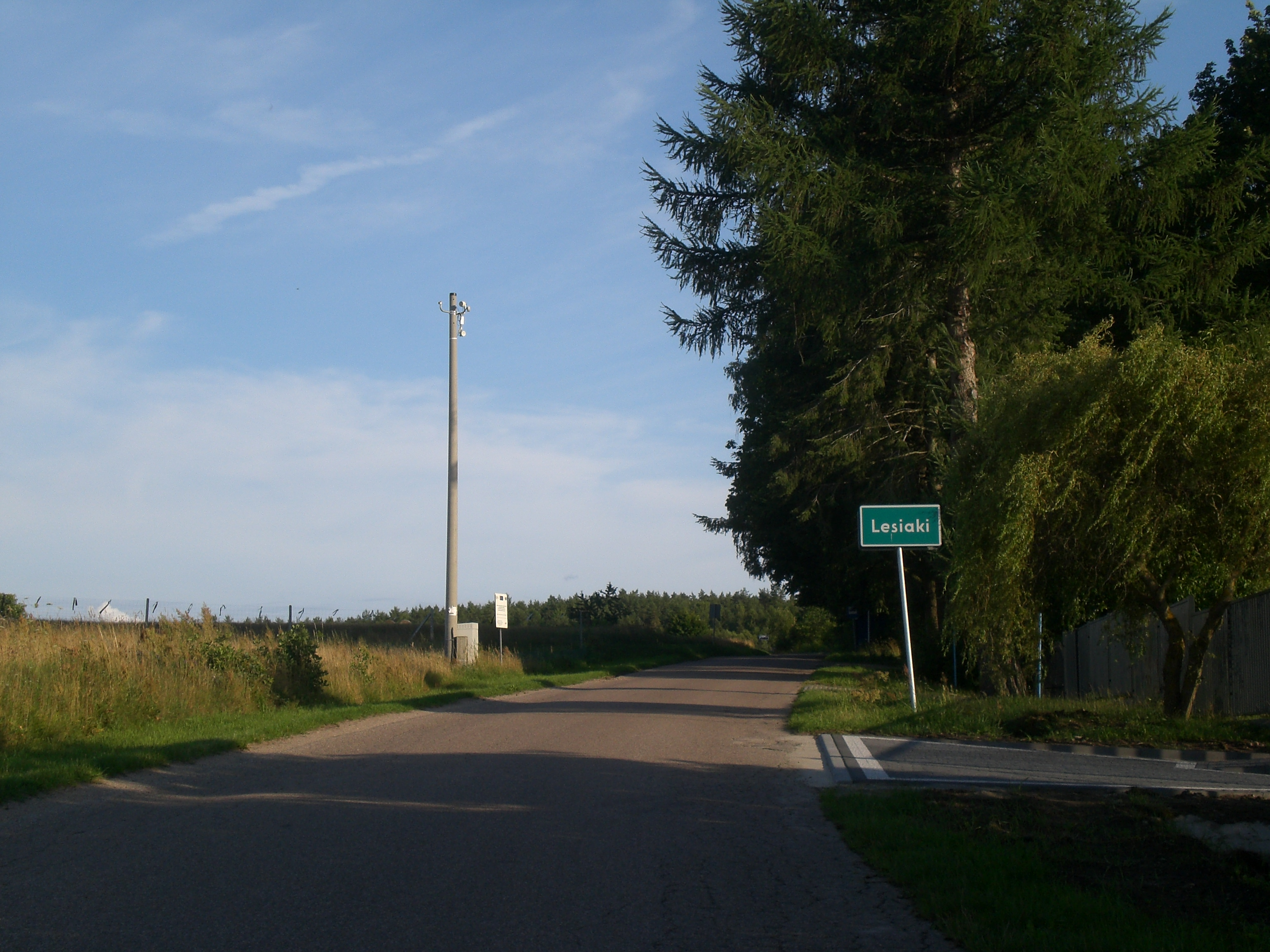

- Location within Poland
- Coordinates: 54°25′8″N 17°40′58″E
- Country: Poland
- Voivodeship: Pomeranian
- County: Lębork
- Gmina: Cewice

Lesiaki [lɛˈɕaki] (German: Lessaken) is a village in the administrative district of Gmina Cewice, within Lębork County, Pomeranian Voivodeship, in northern Poland.

For details of the history of the region, see History of Pomerania.
