= Łebunia =

- Village
- Location within Poland
- Coordinates: 54°27′1″N 17°48′46″E
- Country: Poland
- Voivodeship: Pomeranian
- County: Lębork
- Gmina: Cewice

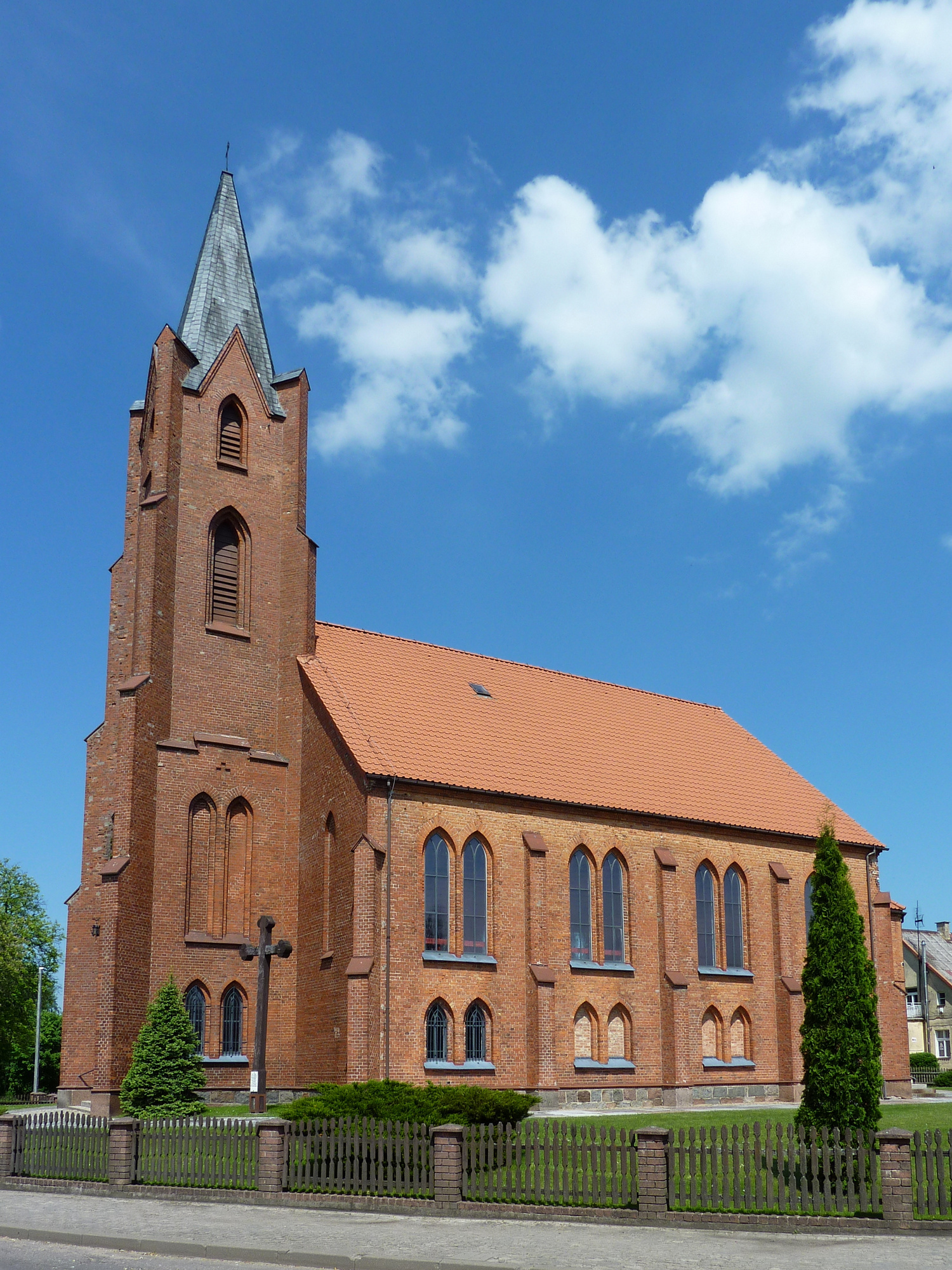
Church

Łebunia [wɛˈbuɲa] is a village in the administrative district of Gmina Cewice, within Lębork County, Pomeranian Voivodeship, in northern Poland.

For details of the history of the region, see History of Pomerania.

== Monuments ==
According to the National Heritage Board of Poland, the following monuments in the area are officially registered:

- Parish Church of St. Michael the Archangel (1870) – registered under number A-1532 on 20 March 1995. The church is built in the neo-Gothic style.
- Palace Complex (19th–20th century) – registered under number A-1179 on 21 July 1987. The complex includes a palace and a park. The palace features a styleless courtyard on an elongated rectangular plan, is single-story, with the western side raised and extended by a wide annex.
