= Strzebielinko Lęborskie railway station =

Railway station in Strzebielinko, Poland

Strzebielinko Lęborskie

General information
- Location: Strzebielinko Lęborskie; Poland
- Coordinates: 54.731286°N 18.033022°E
- Owner: Polskie Koleje Państwowe S.A.
- Platforms: None

Construction
- Structure type: Building: No; Depot: No; Water tower: No

History
- Former names: Fredrichsrode until 1945
Location

Strzebielinko Lęborskie is a non-operational PKP railway station on the disused PKP rail line 230 in Strzebielinko Lęborskie (Pomeranian Voivodeship), Poland.

== Lines crossing the station ==
Start station	End station	Line type
Wejherowo	Garczegorze	Closed
