= Łebień =

Łebień refers to the following places in Poland:

- Łebień, Lębork County
- Łebień, Słupsk County
