= Oskowo railway station =

Railway station in Oskowo, Poland

Oskowo

General information
- Location: Oskowo; Poland
- Coordinates: 54.4°N 17.7°E
- Owner: Polskie Koleje Państwowe S.A.
- Platforms: 2

Construction
- Structure type: Building: Pulled down Depot: Never existed Water tower: Never existed

History
- Former names: Wutzkow until 1945
Location
- Location within Pomeranian Voivodeship Location within Poland

Oskowo is a non-operational PKP railway station in Oskowo (Pomeranian Voivodeship), Poland.

== Lines crossing the station ==
Start station	End station	Line type
Lębork	Bytów	Closed
