= Redkowice =

- Village
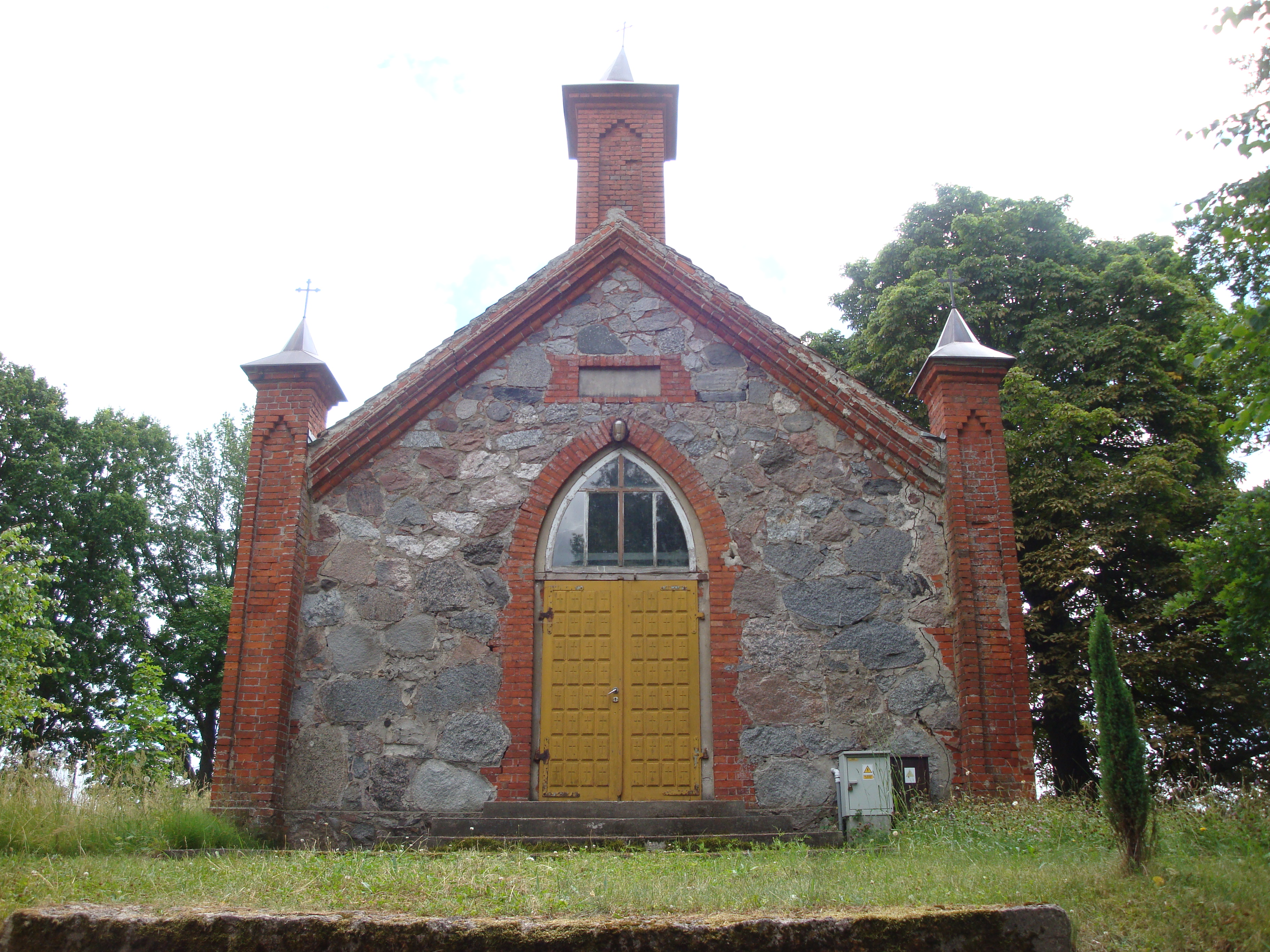
- 19th century chapel

- Location within Poland
- Coordinates: 54°33′28″N 17°38′23″E
- Country: Poland
- Voivodeship: Pomeranian
- County: Lębork
- Gmina: Nowa Wieś Lęborska
- Population: 223

Redkowice [rɛtkɔˈvit͡sɛ] (German: Rettkewitz) is a village in the administrative district of Gmina Nowa Wieś Lęborska, within Lębork County, Pomeranian Voivodeship, in northern Poland.

For details of the history of the region, see History of Pomerania.
