= Czarnówko, Pomeranian Voivodeship =

Czarnówko
- Village
- Location within Poland
- Coordinates: 54°33′40″N 17°41′8″E
- Country: Poland
- Voivodeship: Pomeranian
- County: Lębork
- Gmina: Nowa Wieś Lęborska
- Population: 192

Czarnówko [t͡ʂarˈnufkɔ] is a village in the administrative district of Gmina Nowa Wieś Lęborska, within Lębork County, Pomeranian Voivodeship, in northern Poland. The settlement of Kanin (German: Schlüsselberg, Kashubian: Kôninò) with 50 inhabitants is also part of Czarnówko.

An Iron Age grave of the Wielbark culture was discovered in Czarnówko in 2000. contained a bronze Westland cauldron depicting men with Suebian knots.

For details of the history of the region, see History of Pomerania.
