= Wilkowo Nowowiejskie =

- Village
- Location within Poland
- Coordinates: 54°35′46″N 17°45′25″E
- Country: Poland
- Voivodeship: Pomeranian
- County: Lębork
- Gmina: Nowa Wieś Lęborska
- Population: 173
- Website: http://www.wilkowo.pl

Wilkowo Nowowiejskie [vilˈkɔvɔ nɔvɔˈvjɛi̯skʲɛ] (German: Villkow) is a village in the administrative district of Gmina Nowa Wieś Lęborska within Lębork County, Pomeranian Voivodeship in northern Poland.

For details of the history of the region, see History of Pomerania.
