= Lesnik =

Lesnik, Leśnik, Lesník or Lešnik are Slavic words derived from the root word *lěsъ. (лѣсъ, "forest", modern les, лес). They may refer to:

Lešnik and Lješnik mean hazelnut in the South Slavic languages Lesník means forester in Czech.

== Toponyms ==
- Leśnik (disambiguation), several places in Poland
- Lesnik, Serbia

== People ==
- August Lešnik (1914–1992), Croatian footballer
- Robert Lešnik (born 1971), Slovene car designer

== Other ==
- Lesnik (mythology), Russian and Serbian rendering of the Slavic demon of the forest (Greek Pan (god))
- Lesnik, song russian pank-rock group Korol' i Shut

== See also ==
- Lješnica (disambiguation), Serbo-Croatian toponym
