= Wejherowo Cementownia railway station =

Railway station in Wejherowo, Poland

Coordinates: 54°36′56″N 18°12′31″E

Wejherowo Cementownia

General information
- Location: Wejherowo; Poland
- Owner: Polskie Koleje Państwowe S.A.
- Platforms: 1

Construction
- Structure type: Building: Never existed Depot: Never existed Water tower: Never existed

History
- Former names: Bohlschau; Bohlschau Cementfabrik; Bolschau Zementfabrik; Bolszewo
Location

Wejherowo Cementownia (Wejherowo Cement Plant) is a non-operational PKP railway station on the disused PKP rail line 230 in Wejherowo (Pomeranian Voivodeship), Poland, named for the neighbouring cement works.

== Lines crossing the station ==
Start station	End station	Line type
Wejherowo	Garczegorze	Closed
