= Kamieniec, Pomeranian Voivodeship =

Kamieniec
- Settlement
- Location within Poland
- Coordinates: 54°25′8″N 17°43′29″E
- Country: Poland
- Voivodeship: Pomeranian
- County: Lębork
- Gmina: Cewice

Kamieniec [kaˈmjɛɲɛt͡s] is a settlement in the administrative district of Gmina Cewice, within Lębork County, Pomeranian Voivodeship, in northern Poland.

For details of the history of the region, see History of Pomerania.
