= Nisko (disambiguation) =

Nisko is a town in Subcarpathian Voivodeship in south-west Poland.

Nisko may also refer to the following villages:

- Nisko, Pomeranian Voivodeship (north Poland)
- Nisko, Warmian-Masurian Voivodeship (north-east Poland)
- Nisko, Croatia, a village near Klis
