= Darżkowo, Lębork County =

Darżkowo
- Village
- Location within Poland
- Coordinates: 54°35′N 17°41′E
- Country: Poland
- Voivodeship: Pomeranian
- County: Lębork
- Gmina: Nowa Wieś Lęborska
- Population: 42

Darżkowo [darʂˈkɔvɔ] is a village in the administrative district of Gmina Nowa Wieś Lęborska, within Lębork County, Pomeranian Voivodeship, in northern Poland.

For details of the history of the region, see History of Pomerania.
