= Krępkowice =

- Village
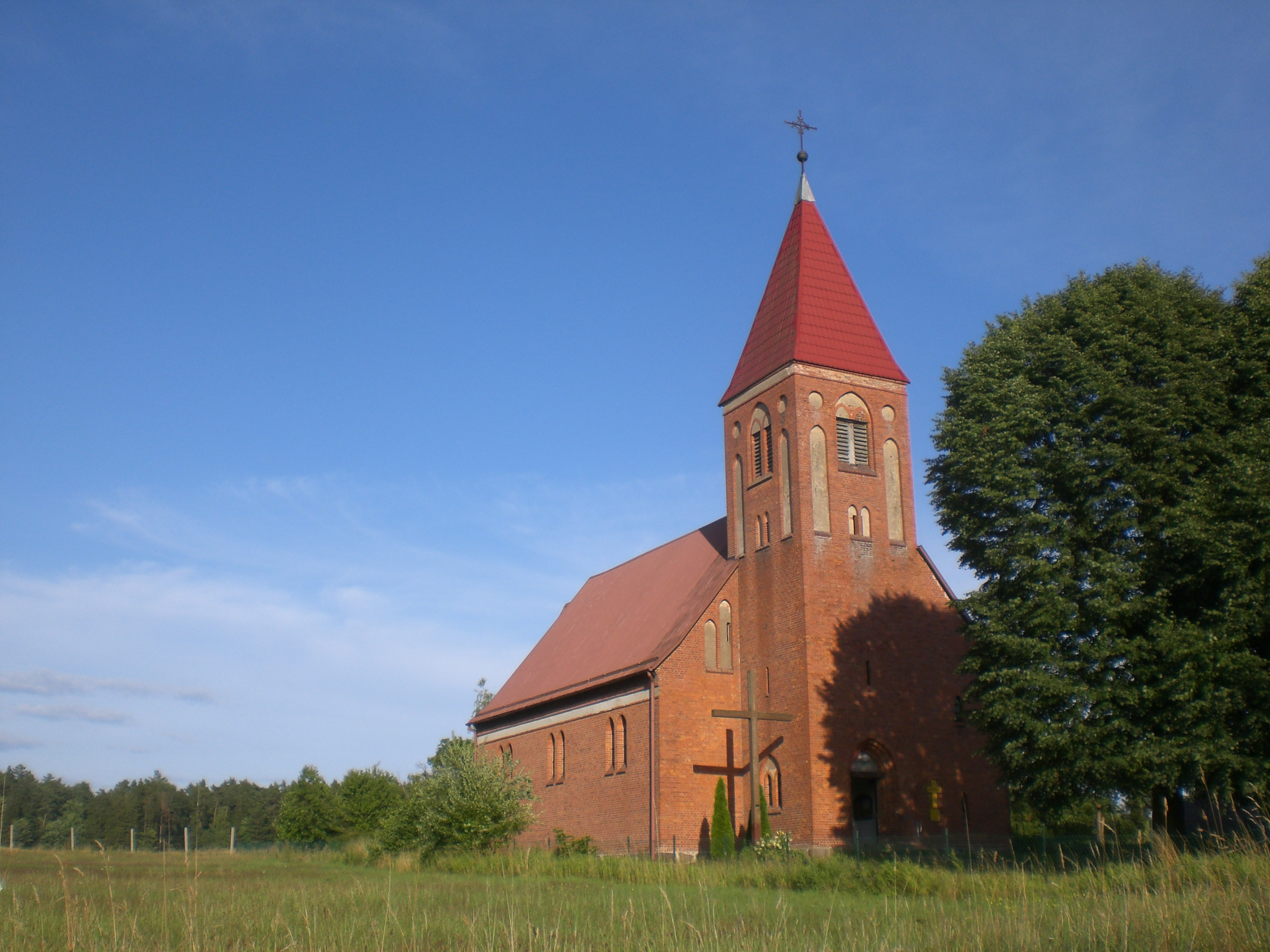
- A church in Krępkowice

- Location within Poland
- Coordinates: 54°27′49″N 17°41′25″E
- Country: Poland
- Voivodeship: Pomeranian
- County: Lębork
- Gmina: Cewice

Krępkowice [krɛmpkɔˈvit͡sɛ] is a village in the administrative district of Gmina Cewice, within Lębork County, Pomeranian Voivodeship, in northern Poland.

For details of the history of the region, see History of Pomerania.
