= Kanin =

Kanin may refer to:

== Geography ==
- Kanin Peninsula, in northwestern Russia
- Kanin Mountains
- Kanin (mountain), a mountain on the border of Slovenia and Italy
- Kanin Point
- Kanin, Pomeranian Voivodeship, a village in Poland
- Kanin, West Pomeranian Voivodeship, a village in Poland

== Other ==
- Kanin (name)
- Kanin-class destroyer
