= Pieski, Pomeranian Voivodeship =

Pieski
- Village
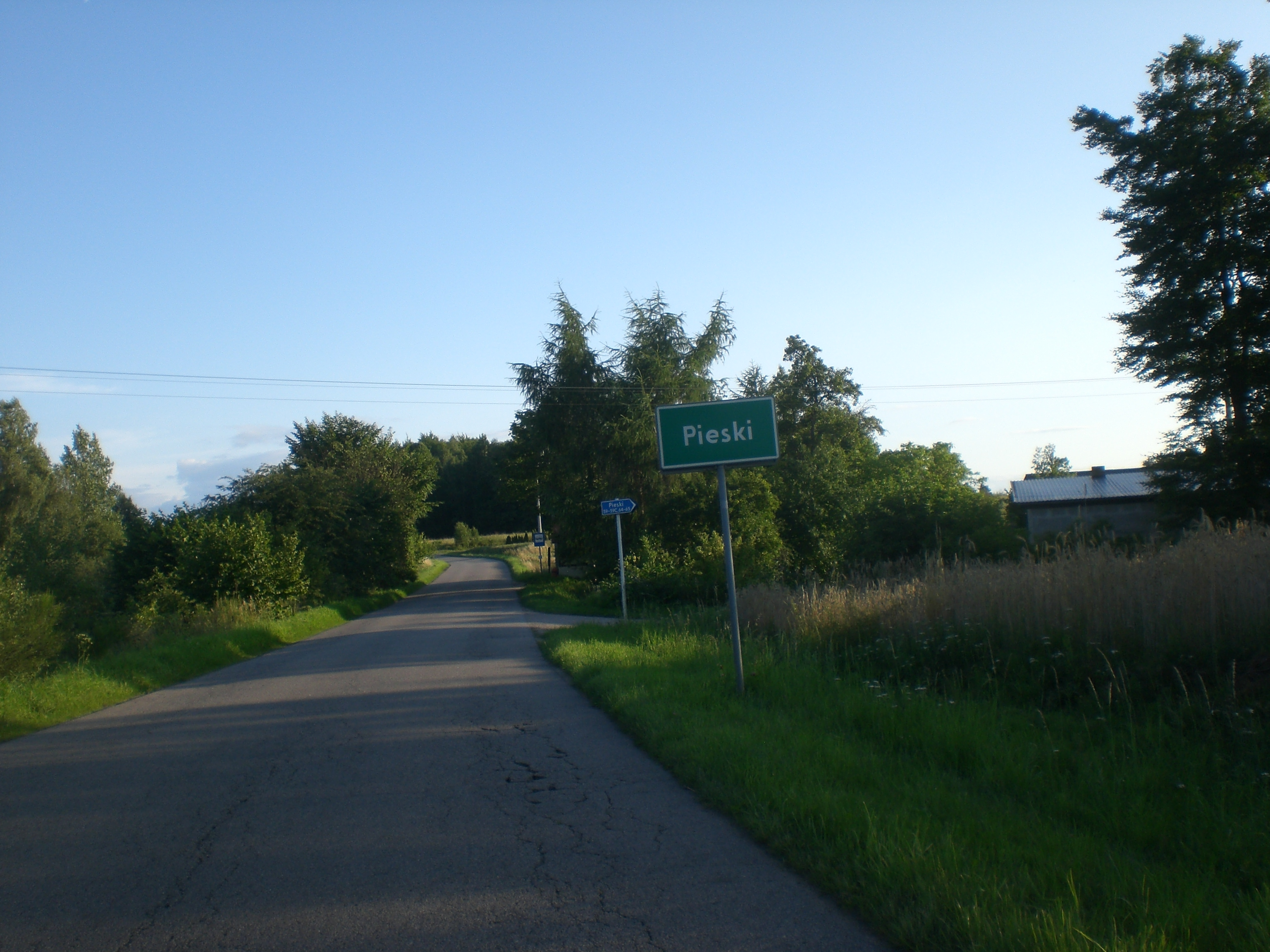

- Location within Poland
- Coordinates: 54°22′35″N 17°45′51″E
- Country: Poland
- Voivodeship: Pomeranian
- County: Lębork
- Gmina: Cewice

Pieski [ˈpjɛski] is a village in the administrative district of Gmina Cewice, within Lębork County, Pomeranian Voivodeship, in northern Poland.

For details of the history of the region, see History of Pomerania.
