= Krępkowo, Pomeranian Voivodeship =

Krępkowo
- Settlement
- Location within Poland
- Coordinates: 54°26′51″N 17°42′01″E
- Country: Poland
- Voivodeship: Pomeranian
- County: Lębork
- Gmina: Cewice

Krępkowo [krɛmpˈkɔvɔ] is a settlement in the administrative district of Gmina Cewice, within Lębork County, Pomeranian Voivodeship, in northern Poland.

For details of the history of the region, see History of Pomerania.
