= Lisewo Kaszubskie railway station =

Railway station in Wejherowo County, Poland

Lisewo Kaszubskie

General information
- Location: Lisewo Kaszubskie; Poland
- Coordinates: 54.691363°N 18.040564°E
- Owner: Polskie Koleje Państwowe S.A.
- Platforms: None

Construction
- Structure type: Building: No; Depot: No; Water tower: No

History
- Former names: Lissow until 1945
Location

Lisewo Kaszubskie is a non-operational PKP railway station on the disused PKP rail line 230 in Lisewo Kaszubskie (Pomeranian Voivodeship), Poland.

== Lines crossing the station ==
| Start station | End station | Line type |
|---|---|---|
| Wejherowo | Garczegorze | Closed |
