= Góra Pomorska railway station =

Railway station in Pomeranian Voivodeship, Poland

Coordinates: 54°38′18″N 18°07′59″E

Góra Pomorska

General information
- Location: Góra Pomorska; Poland
- Owner: Polskie Koleje Państwowe S.A.
- Platforms: None

Construction
- Structure type: Building: Never existed Depot: Never existed Water tower: Never existed
Location

Góra Pomorska is a non-operational PKP railway station on the disused PKP rail line 230 in Góra Pomorska (Pomeranian Voivodeship), Poland.

== Lines crossing the station ==
Start station	End station	Line type
Wejherowo	Garczegorze	Closed
