= Jamy, Pomeranian Voivodeship =

Jamy
- Village
- Location within Poland
- Coordinates: 54°32′45″N 17°47′28″E
- Country: Poland
- Voivodeship: Pomeranian
- County: Lębork
- Gmina: Nowa Wieś Lęborska

Jamy [ˈjamɨ] is a village in the administrative district of Gmina Nowa Wieś Lęborska, within Lębork County, Pomeranian Voivodeship, in northern Poland.

For details of the history of the region, see History of Pomerania.
