= Rybki =

- Informal neighborhood
- Location within Poland
- Coordinates: 54°30′39″N 17°46′43″E
- Country: Poland
- Voivodeship: Pomeranian
- County: Lębork
- Gmina: Lębork

Rybki [ˈrɨpki] (Kashubian: Ribczi) is a part of the city of Lębork, located in its southern area. Before January 1, 2026, it was an independent settlement in the Gmina Nowa Wieś Lęborska.
