= Lubowidz, Pomeranian Voivodeship =

Village in Kashubia

Lubowidz Lëbòwidz
- Village
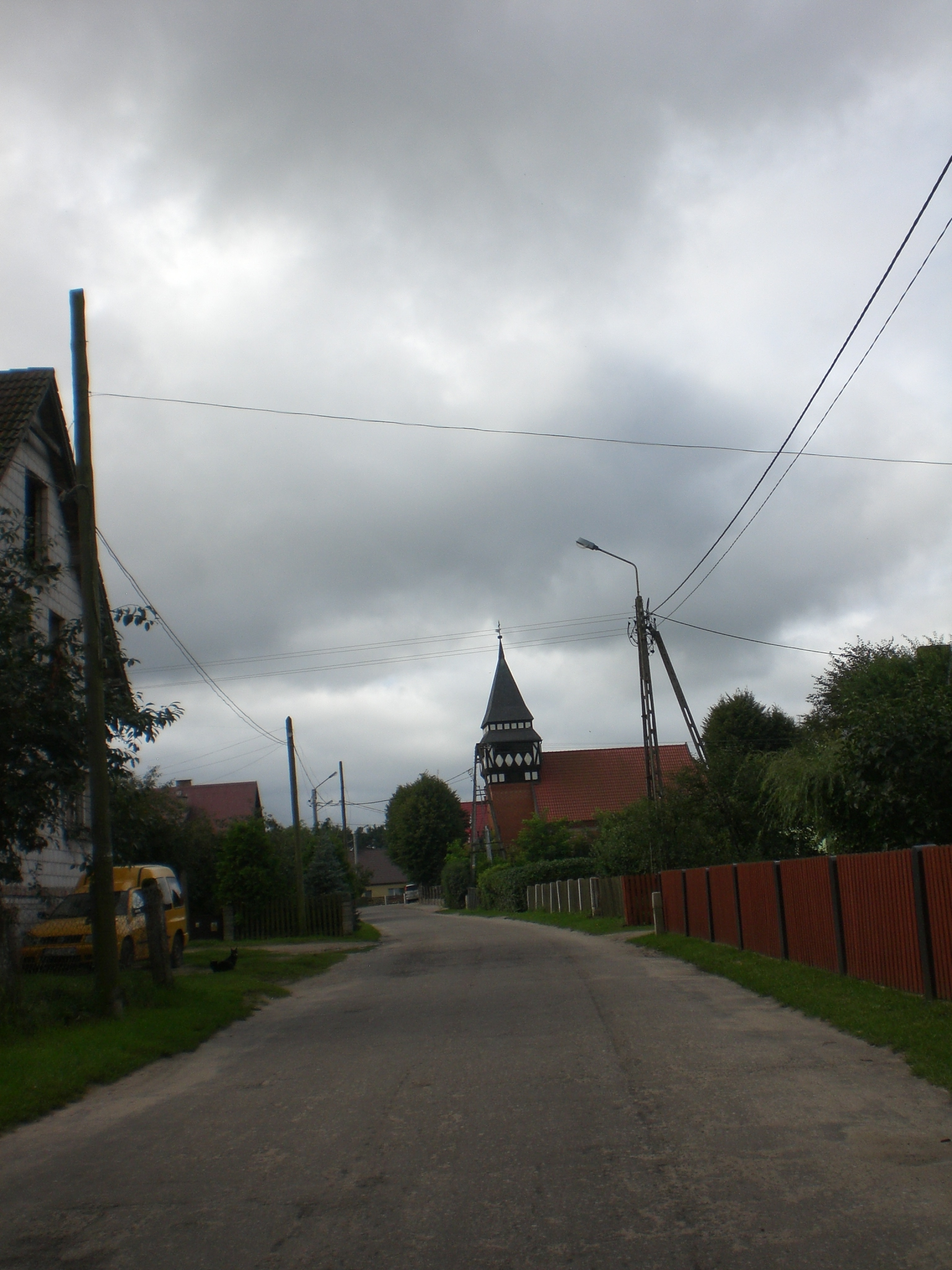

- Location within Poland
- Coordinates: 54°32′33″N 17°48′49″E
- Country: Poland
- Voivodeship: Pomeranian
- County: Lębork
- Gmina: Nowa Wieś Lęborska
- Population: 393
- Time zone: CEST
  - Summer (DST): CET
- SIMC: 0748425

Lubowidz [luˈbɔvit͡s] (Kashubian: Lëbòwidz) is a village in the administrative district of Gmina Nowa Wieś Lęborska, within Lębork County, Pomeranian Voivodeship, in northern Poland.

== History ==
The village has been documented since 1400, first as Lubovese (meaning Lubo's Meadow), then in 1455 as Luggewiese. The Middle Polish wording of the name in the form Lubowidze appeared in 1686. The Geographical Dictionary of the Kingdom of Poland from 1884 lists the village as Ługi (German: Luggewiese).

A cemetery of the Wielbark culture dating from the 1st to the 2nd century AD was discovered near the village. The first chronological phase of this culture was named after the place.

For details of the history of the region, see History of Pomerania.
