= Bukowina, Pomeranian Voivodeship =

Bukowina
- Village
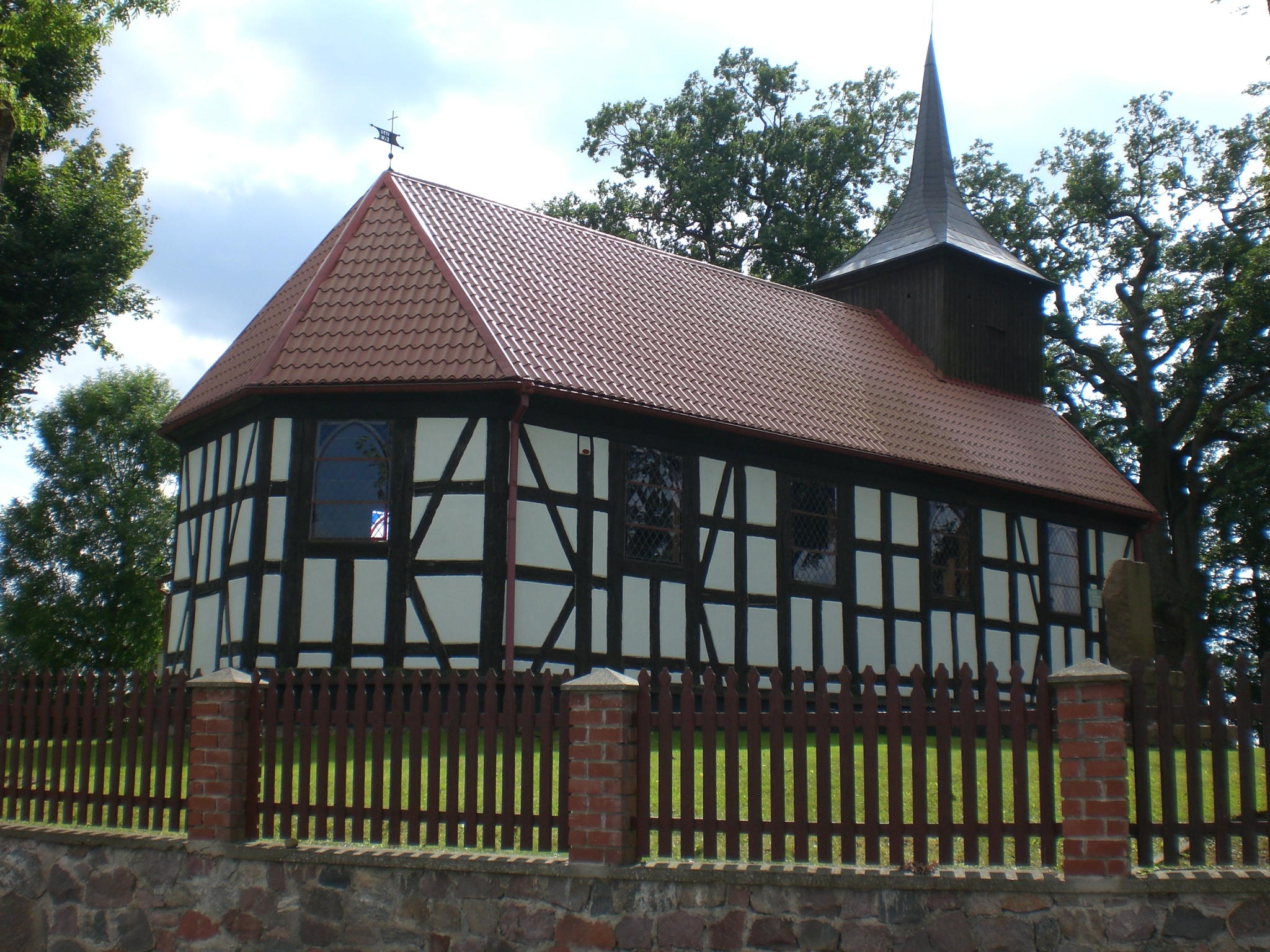
- Church of the Nativity of the Virgin Mary in Bukowina

- Location within Poland
- Coordinates: 54°25′24″N 17°50′32″E
- Country: Poland
- Voivodeship: Pomeranian
- County: Lębork
- Gmina: Cewice
- Population: 541
- Time zone: UTC+1 (CET)
  - Summer (DST): UTC+2 (CEST)
- Vehicle registration: GLE

Bukowina [bukɔˈvina] (German: Buckowin) is a village in the administrative district of Gmina Cewice, within Lębork County, Pomeranian Voivodeship, in northern Poland. It is located in the ethnocultural region of Kashubia.
