= Bąsewice =

- Village
- Location within Poland
- Coordinates: 54°40′6″N 17°47′8″E
- Country: Poland
- Voivodeship: Pomeranian
- County: Lębork
- Gmina: Nowa Wieś Lęborska
- Population: 150

Bąsewice [bɔ̃sɛˈvit͡sɛ] is a village in the administrative district of Gmina Nowa Wieś Lęborska, within Lębork County, Pomeranian Voivodeship, in northern Poland.

For details of the history of the region, see History of Pomerania.
