= Krępa Kaszubska =

- Village
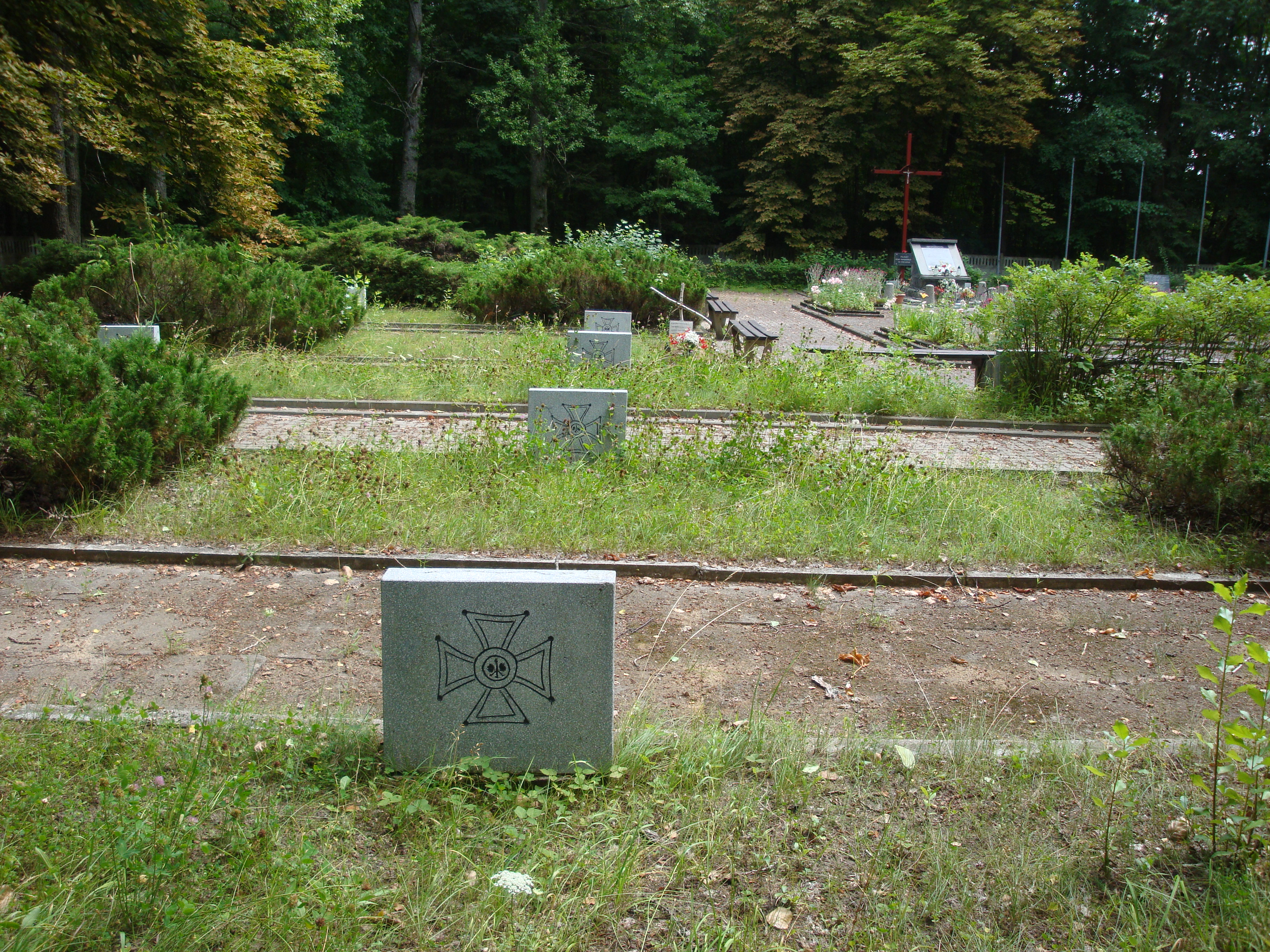
- Cemetery of Stutthof concentration camp victims

- Location within Poland
- Coordinates: 54°37′45″N 17°39′15″E
- Country: Poland
- Voivodeship: Pomeranian
- County: Lębork
- Gmina: Nowa Wieś Lęborska
- Population: 505

Krępa Kaszubska [ˈkrɛmpa kaˈʂupska] is a village in the administrative district of Gmina Nowa Wieś Lęborska, within Lębork County, Pomeranian Voivodeship, in northern Poland.

== See also ==
For details of the history of the region, see History of Pomerania.
