= Cewice railway station =

Railway station in Poland

Cewice

General information
- Location: Cewice; Poland
- Owner: Polskie Koleje Państwowe S.A.
- Platforms: 2

Construction
- Structure type: Building: Yes (no longer used); Depot: Never existed Water tower: Never existed

History
- Former names: Zewitz until 1945
Location

Cewice is a non-operational PKP railway station in Cewice (Pomeranian Voivodeship), Poland.

== Lines crossing the station ==
| Start station | End station | Line type |
|---|---|---|
| Lębork | Bytów | Closed |
