= Laska, Lębork County =

Village in Kashubia

Laska Lôska
- Village
- Location within Poland
- Coordinates: 54°30′19″N 17°34′38″E
- Country: Poland
- Voivodeship: Pomeranian
- County: Lębork
- Gmina: Nowa Wieś Lęborska

Laska [ˈlaska] (Kashubian: Lôska) is a village in the administrative district of Gmina Nowa Wieś Lęborska, within Lębork County, Pomeranian Voivodeship, in northern Poland.

For details of the history of the region, see History of Pomerania.
