= Okalice =

- Village
- Location within Poland
- Coordinates: 54°28′2″N 17°50′24″E
- Country: Poland
- Voivodeship: Pomeranian
- County: Lębork
- Gmina: Cewice
- Population: 133

Okalice [ɔkaˈlit͡sɛ] is a village in the administrative district of Gmina Cewice, within Lębork County, Pomeranian Voivodeship, in northern Poland.
