= Osowo Lęborskie railway station =

Railway station in Osowo Lęborskie, Poland

Osowo Lęborskie

General information
- Location: Osowo Lęborskie; Poland
- Coordinates: 54.47°N 17.76°E
- Owner: Polskie Koleje Państwowe S.A.

Construction
- Structure type: Building: Yes (no longer used); Depot: Never existed Water tower: Never existed

History
- Former names: Wussow (Kr. Lauenberg) until 1945
Location
- Location within Pomeranian Voivodeship Location within Poland

Osowo Lęborskie is a non-operational PKP railway station in Osowo Lęborskie (Pomeranian Voivodeship), Poland.

== Lines crossing the station ==
| Start station | End station | Line type |
|---|---|---|
| Lębork | Bytów | Closed |
