= Karwica, Pomeranian Voivodeship =

Karwica
- Village
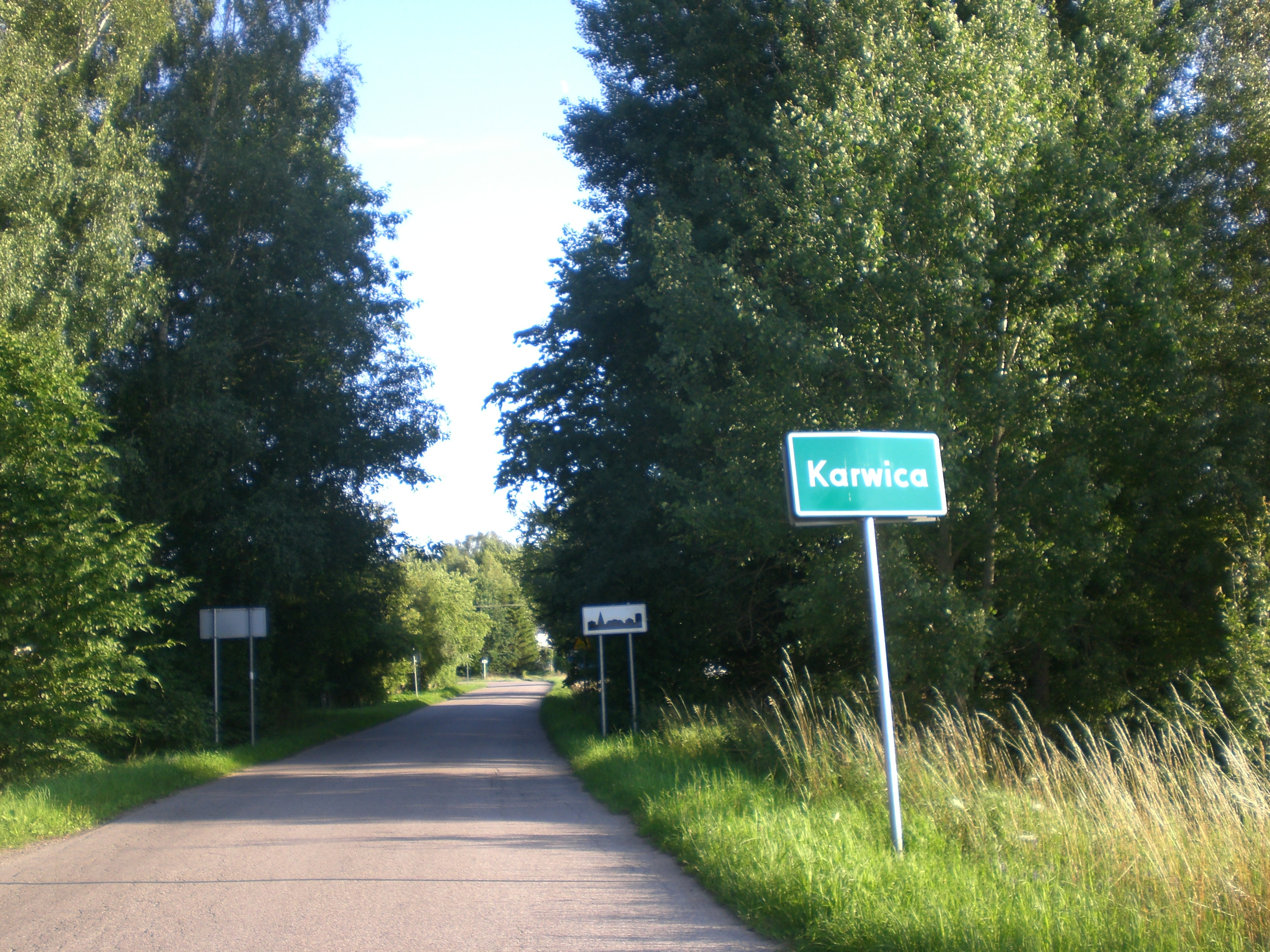

- Location within Poland
- Coordinates: 54°25′21″N 17°40′54″E
- Country: Poland
- Voivodeship: Pomeranian
- County: Lębork
- Gmina: Cewice

Karwica [karˈvit͡sa] (German: Gerhardshöhe) is a village in the administrative district of Gmina Cewice, within Lębork County, Pomeranian Voivodeship, in northern Poland.
