= Pogorszewo =

- Village
- Location within Poland
- Coordinates: 54°35′26″N 17°41′15″E
- Country: Poland
- Voivodeship: Pomeranian
- County: Lębork
- Gmina: Nowa Wieś Lęborska
- Population: 343

Pogorszewo (Polish pronunciation: [pɔɡɔrˈʂɛvɔ]) is a village in the administrative district of Gmina Nowa Wieś Lęborska, within Lębork County, Pomeranian Voivodeship, in northern Poland.
