= Popowo, Lębork County =

Popowo
- Village
- Location within Poland
- Coordinates: 54°28′51″N 17°51′20″E
- Country: Poland
- Voivodeship: Pomeranian
- County: Lębork
- Gmina: Cewice
- Population: 202

Popowo [pɔˈpɔvɔ] (German: Poppow) is a village in the administrative district of Gmina Cewice, within Lębork County, Pomeranian Voivodeship, in northern Poland.

For details of the history of the region, see History of Pomerania.
