= Dziechno =

- Village
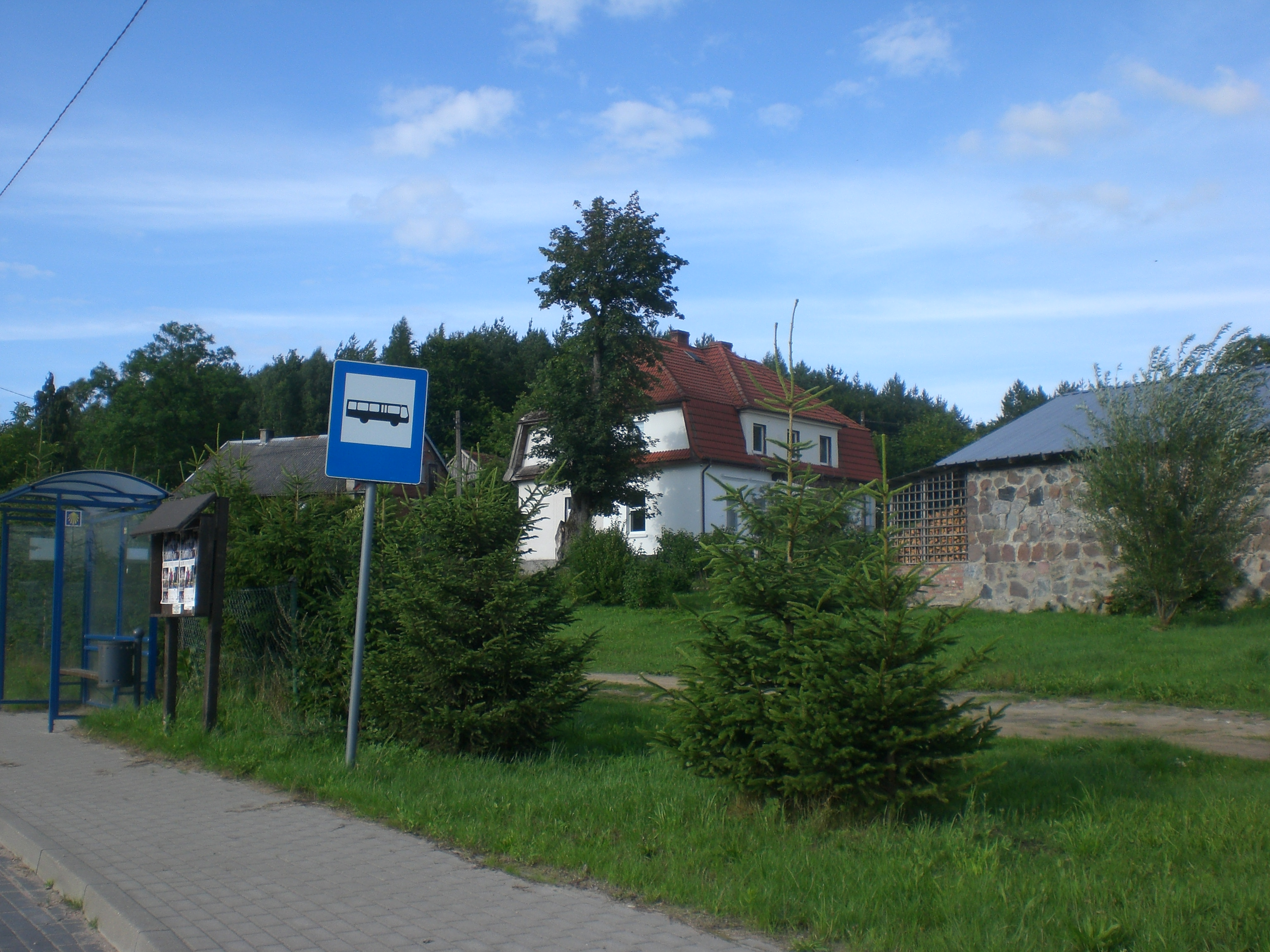

- Location within Poland
- Coordinates: 54°29′52″N 17°50′38″E
- Country: Poland
- Voivodeship: Pomeranian
- County: Lębork
- Gmina: Cewice

Dziechno [ˈd͡ʑɛxnɔ] is a village in the administrative district of Gmina Cewice, within Lębork County, Pomeranian Voivodeship, in northern Poland.

For details of the history of the region, see History of Pomerania.
