= Chocielewko =

- Village
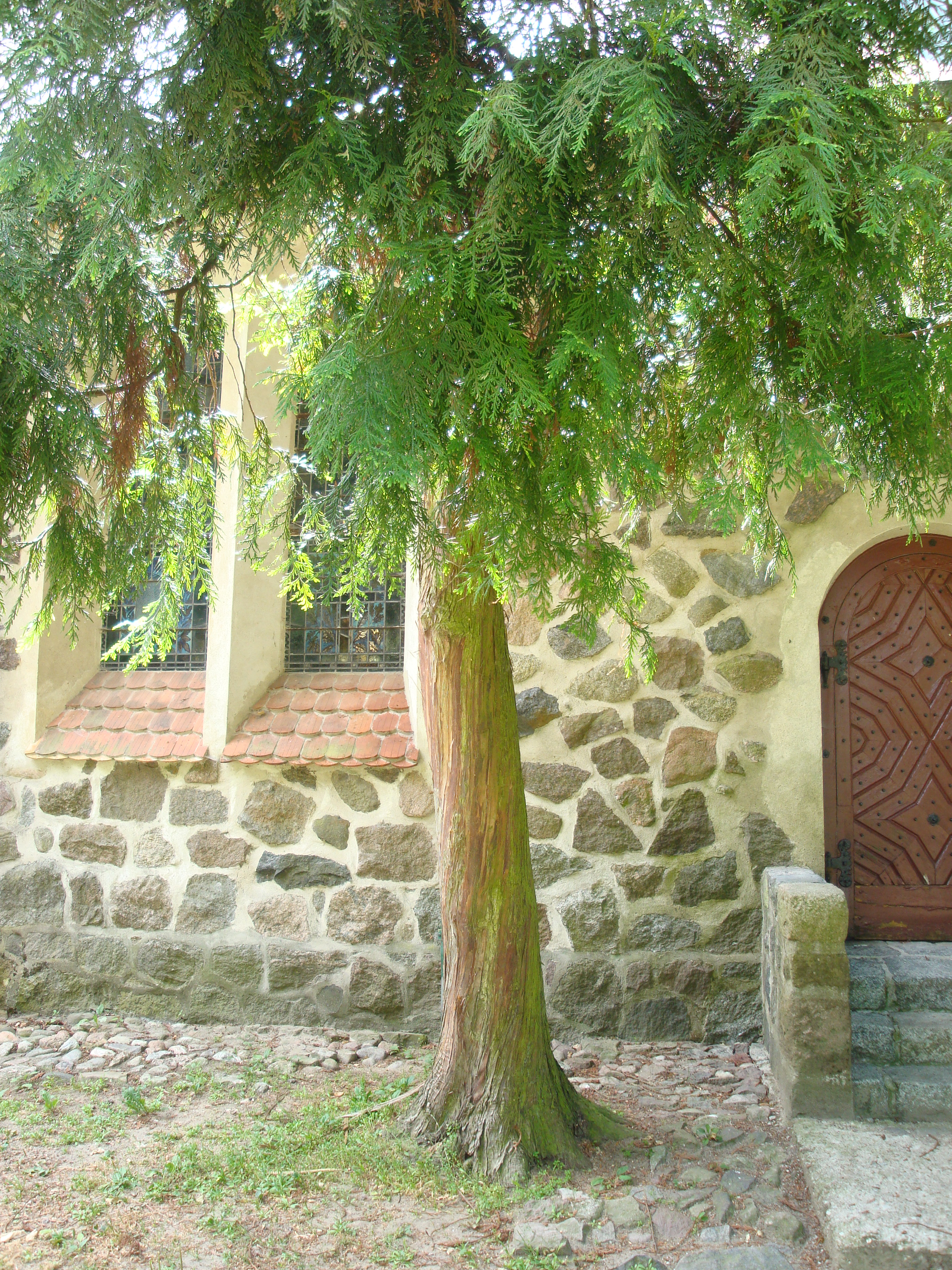
- Taxus near church in Chocielewko

- Location within Poland
- Coordinates: 54°32′17″N 17°38′16″E
- Country: Poland
- Voivodeship: Pomeranian
- County: Lębork
- Gmina: Nowa Wieś Lęborska
- Population: 482

Chocielewko [xɔt͡ɕɛˈlɛfkɔ] (German: Mackensen) is a village in the administrative district of Gmina Nowa Wieś Lęborska, within Lębork County, Pomeranian Voivodeship, in northern Poland.

For details of the history of the region, see History of Pomerania.
