= Bąkowo, Lębork County =

Bąkowo
- Village
- Location within Poland
- Coordinates: 54°30′35″N 17°40′4″E
- Country: Poland
- Voivodeship: Pomeranian
- County: Lębork
- Gmina: Nowa Wieś Lęborska

Bąkowo [bɔnˈkɔvɔ] is a village in the administrative district of Gmina Nowa Wieś Lęborska, within Lębork County, Pomeranian Voivodeship, in northern Poland.
