= Unieszynko =

- Village
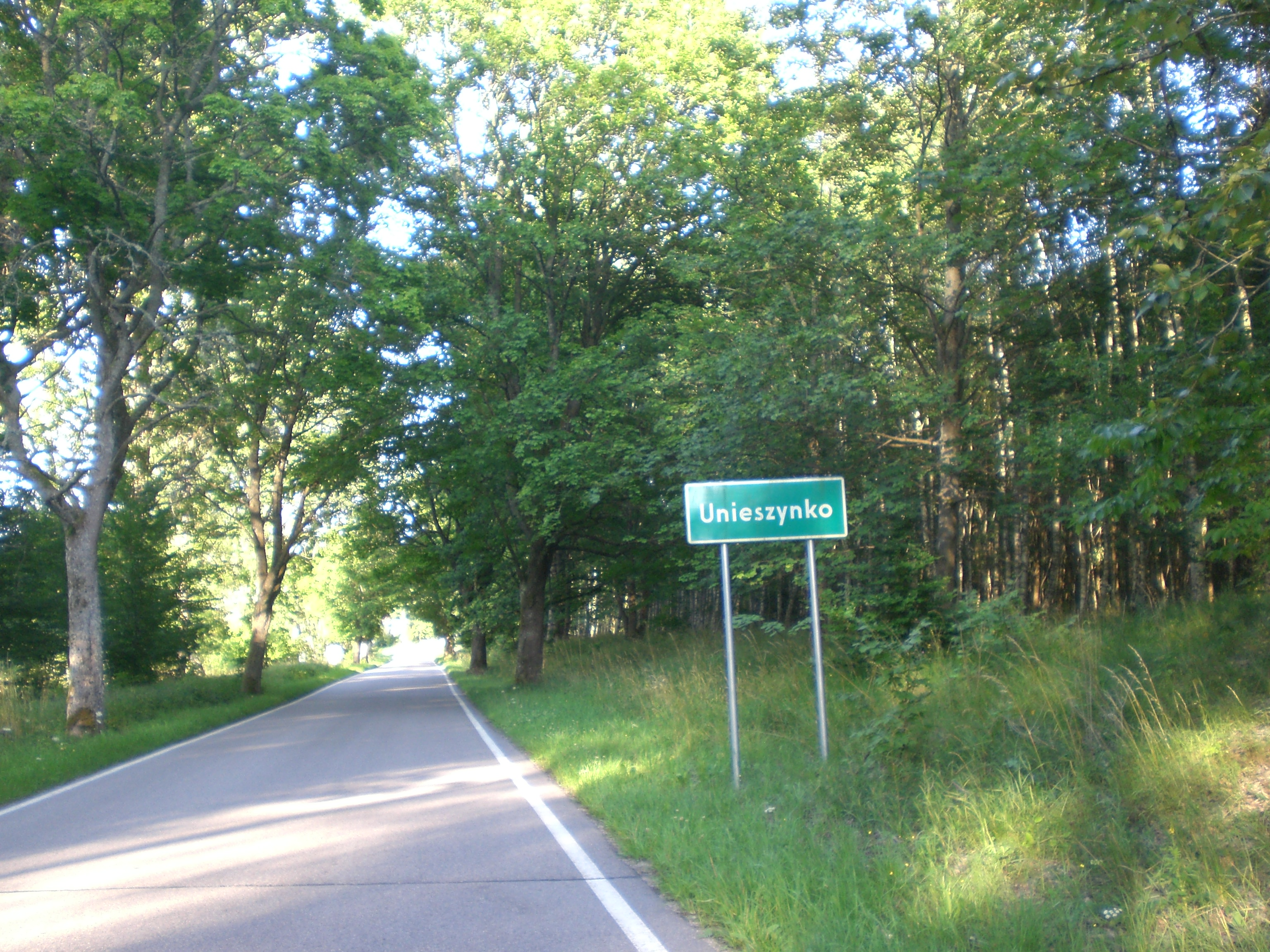
- The road that leads to Unieszynko

- Location within Poland
- Coordinates: 54°26′52″N 17°39′47″E
- Country: Poland
- Voivodeship: Pomeranian
- County: Lębork
- Gmina: Cewice
- Population: 80

Unieszynko [uɲɛˈʂɨnkɔ] is a village in the administrative district of Gmina Cewice, within Lębork County, Pomeranian Voivodeship, in northern Poland.

For details of the history of the region, see History of Pomerania.
