= Nowa Wieś Lęborska railway station =

Railway station in Poland

Nowa Wieś Lęborska

General information
- Location: Nowa Wieś Lęborska; Poland
- Coordinates: 54.5586°N 17.7216°E
- Owner: Polskie Koleje Państwowe S.A.
- Platforms: 1

Construction
- Structure type: Building: Pulled down Depot: Never existed Water tower: Never existed

History
- Former names: Neuendorf (Kr. Lauenburg) until 1945
Location

Nowa Wieś Lęborska is a PKP railway station in Nowa Wieś Lęborska (Pomeranian Voivodeship), Poland.

== Lines crossing the station ==
Start station	End station	Line type
Pruszcz Gdański	Łeba	Passenger/Freight
