= Lędziechowo railway station =

Railway station in Poland

Lędziechowo
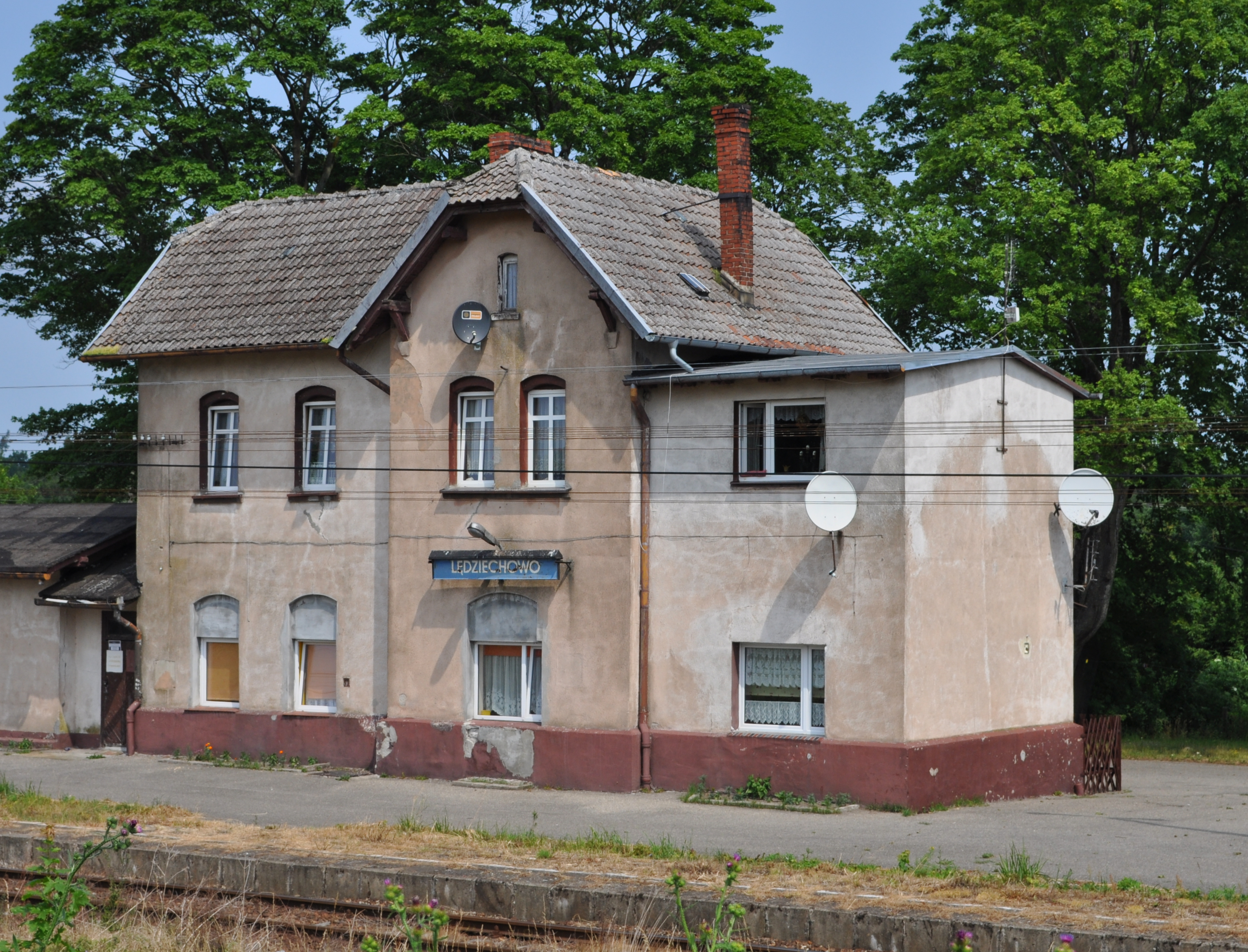

General information
- Location: Lędziechowo; Poland
- Coordinates: 54.643915°N 17.683643°E
- Owner: Polskie Koleje Państwowe S.A.
- Platforms: 1

Construction
- Structure type: Building: Yes (no longer used); Depot: Never existed Water tower: Never existed

History
- Former names: Landechow until 1945
Location

Lędziechowo is a PKP railway station in Lędziechowo (Pomeranian Voivodeship), Poland.

== Lines crossing the station ==
Start station	End station	Line type
Pruszcz Gdański	Łeba	Passenger/Freight
