= Gmina Nowa Wieś Lęborska =

Gmina Nowa Wieś Lęborska Nowa Wieś Lęborska Commune
- Gmina
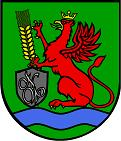
- Coat of arms
- Interactive map of Gmina Nowa Wieś Lęborska
- Coordinates (Nowa Wieś Lęborska): 54°33′27″N 17°43′37″E
- Country: Poland
- Voivodeship: Pomeranian
- County: Lębork
- Seat: Nowa Wieś Lęborska

Area
  - Total: 270.39 km^{2} (104.40 sq mi)

Population (2006)
  - Total: 12,390
  - Density: 45.82/km^{2} (118.7/sq mi)

Gmina Nowa Wieś Lęborska is a rural gmina (administrative district) in Lębork County, Pomeranian Voivodeship, in northern Poland. Its seat is the village of Nowa Wieś Lęborska, approximately 2 kilometres (1 mi) north-west of Lębork and 63 km (39 mi) west of the regional capital Gdańsk.

The gmina covers an area of 270.39 square kilometres (104.4 sq mi), and as of 2006 its total population is 12,390.

== Villages ==
Gmina Nowa Wieś Lęborska contains the villages and settlements of Bąkowo, Bąsewice, Brzezinki, Chocielewko, Czarnówko, Darżewo, Darżkowo, Dziechlino, Garczegorze, Jamy, Janisławiec, Janowice, Janowiczki, Kanin, Karlikowo Lęborskie, Kębłowo Nowowiejskie, Kozołęka, Krępa Kaszubska, Laska, Łebień, Lędziechowo, Leśnice, Łówcze, Lubowidz, Ługi, Małoszyce, Mosty, Niebędzino, Nisko, Nowa Wieś Lęborska, Obliwice, Piotrowo, Piskowa, Pogorszewo, Pogorzele, Pogorzelice, Redkowice, Rekowo Lęborskie, Rozgorze, Rybki, Rybnik, Tawęcino, Wilkowo Nowowiejskie, Wypichowo and Żelazkowo.

== Neighbouring gminas ==
Gmina Nowa Wieś Lęborska is bordered by the town of Lębork and by the gminas of Cewice, Choczewo, Główczyce, Łęczyce, Potęgowo and Wicko.
