= Janisławiec, Pomeranian Voivodeship =

Janisławiec
- Village
- Location within Poland
- Coordinates: 54°37′0″N 17°42′6″E
- Country: Poland
- Voivodeship: Pomeranian
- County: Lębork
- Gmina: Nowa Wieś Lęborska

Janisławiec [janiˈswavjɛt͡s] is a village in the administrative district of Gmina Nowa Wieś Lęborska, within Lębork County, Pomeranian Voivodeship, in northern Poland.

For details of the history of the region, see History of Pomerania.
