= Dziechlino =

- Village
- Location within Poland
- Coordinates: 54°29′52″N 17°42′3″E
- Country: Poland
- Voivodeship: Pomeranian
- County: Lębork
- Gmina: Nowa Wieś Lęborska
- Population: 111

Dziechlino [d͡ʑɛˈxlinɔ] is a village in the administrative district of Gmina Nowa Wieś Lęborska, within Lębork County, Pomeranian Voivodeship, in northern Poland.

For details of the history of the region, see History of Pomerania.
