= Lędziechowo =

- Village
- Location within Poland
- Coordinates: 54°38′48″N 17°41′7″E
- Country: Poland
- Voivodeship: Pomeranian
- County: Lębork
- Gmina: Nowa Wieś Lęborska
- Population: 312

Lędziechowo [lɛnd͡ʑɛˈxɔvɔ] is a village in the administrative district of Gmina Nowa Wieś Lęborska, within Lębork County, Pomeranian Voivodeship, in northern Poland.

For details of the history of the region, see History of Pomerania.
