= Janowice, Pomeranian Voivodeship =

Janowice
- Village
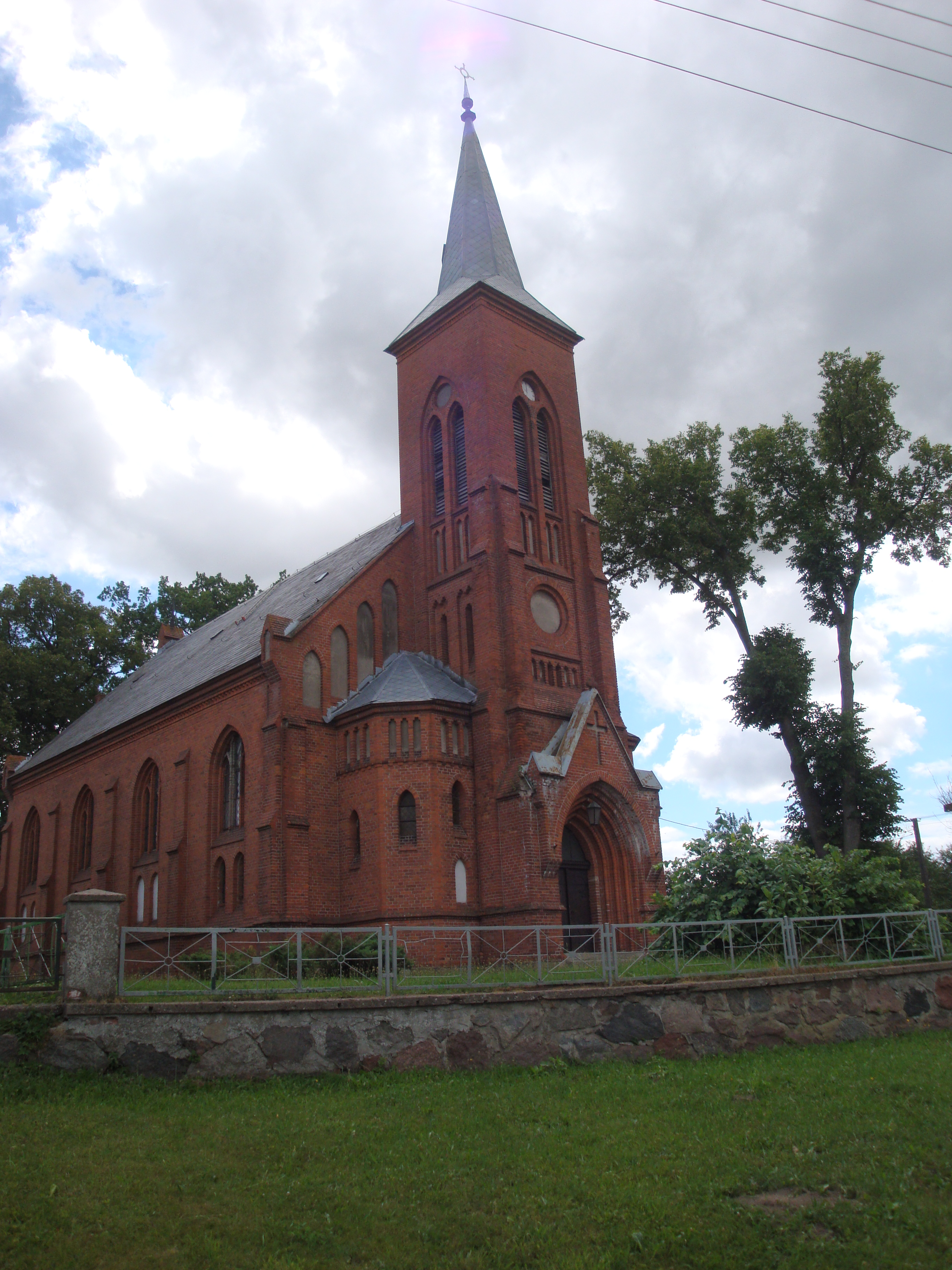
- Church in Janowice

- Location within Poland
- Coordinates: 54°36′14″N 17°38′26″E
- Country: Poland
- Voivodeship: Pomeranian
- County: Lębork
- Gmina: Nowa Wieś Lęborska
- Population: 444

Janowice [janɔˈvit͡sɛ] (German: Groß Jannewitz) is a village in the administrative district of Gmina Nowa Wieś Lęborska, within Lębork County, Pomeranian Voivodeship, in northern Poland.

For details of the history of the region, see History of Pomerania.
