= Obliwice =

- Village
- Location within Poland
- Coordinates: 54°36′57″N 17°44′32″E
- Country: Poland
- Voivodeship: Pomeranian
- County: Lębork
- Gmina: Nowa Wieś Lęborska
- Population: 231

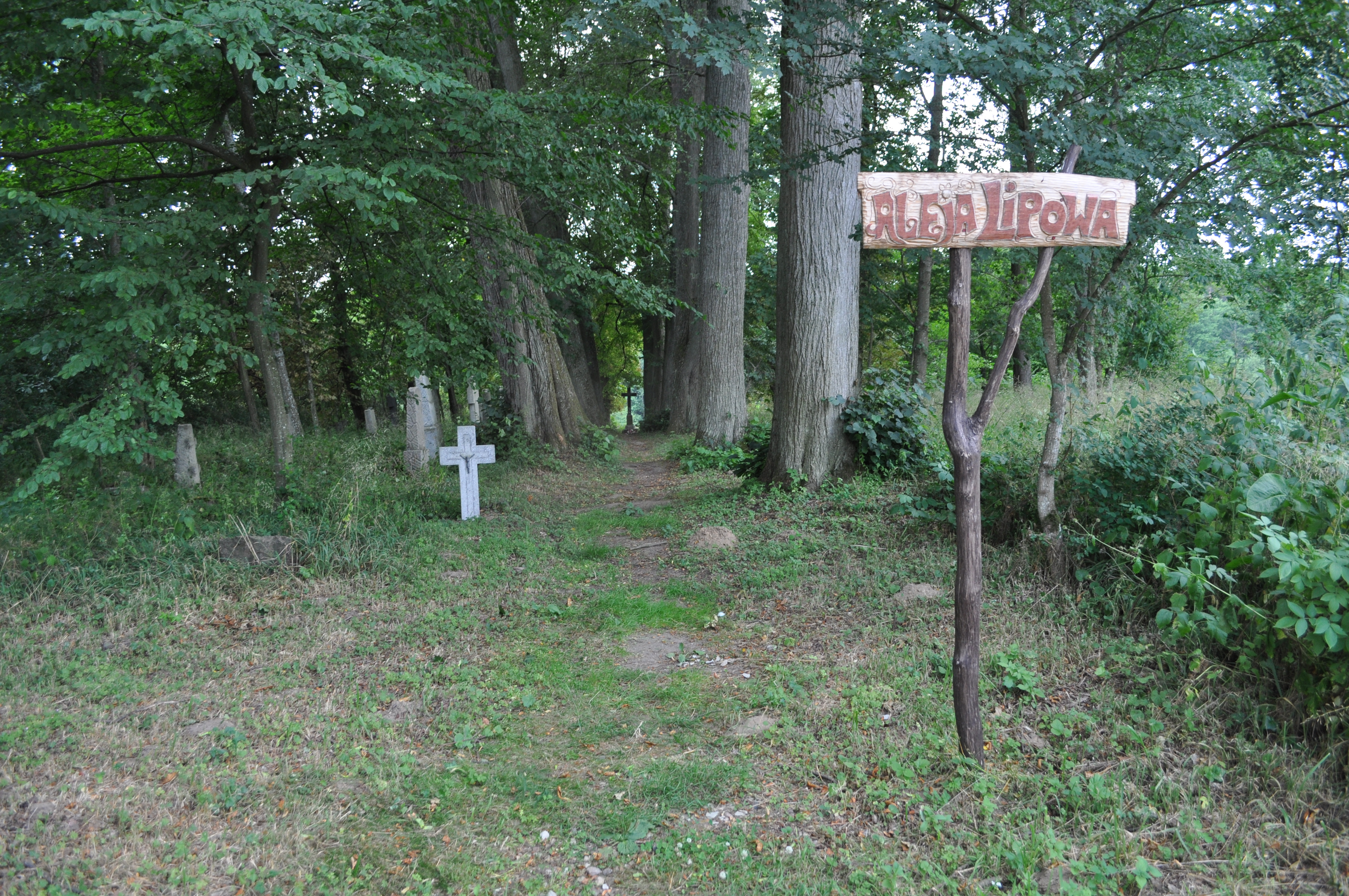
Cemetery in Obliwice

Obliwice [ɔbliˈvit͡sɛ] is a village in the administrative district of Gmina Nowa Wieś Lęborska, within Lębork County, Pomeranian Voivodeship, in northern Poland.

For details of the history of the region, see History of Pomerania.
