= Leśnik =

Leśnik may refer to:

- Leśnik, Międzychód County in Greater Poland Voivodeship (west-central Poland)
- Leśnik, Kuyavian-Pomeranian Voivodeship (north-central Poland)
- Leśnik, Łódź Voivodeship (central Poland)
- Leśnik, Złotów County in Greater Poland Voivodeship (west-central Poland)
- Leśnik, Opole Voivodeship (south-west Poland)
- Leśnik, Pomeranian Voivodeship (north Poland)
