= Nisko, Pomeranian Voivodeship =

Nisko
- Settlement
- Location within Poland
- Coordinates: 54°32′45″N 17°49′23″E
- Country: Poland
- Voivodeship: Pomeranian
- County: Lębork
- Gmina: Nowa Wieś Lęborska

Nisko [ˈniskɔ] is a settlement in the administrative district of Gmina Nowa Wieś Lęborska, within Lębork County, Pomeranian Voivodeship, in northern Poland.

For details of the history of the region, see History of Pomerania.
