= Leśnice =

- Village
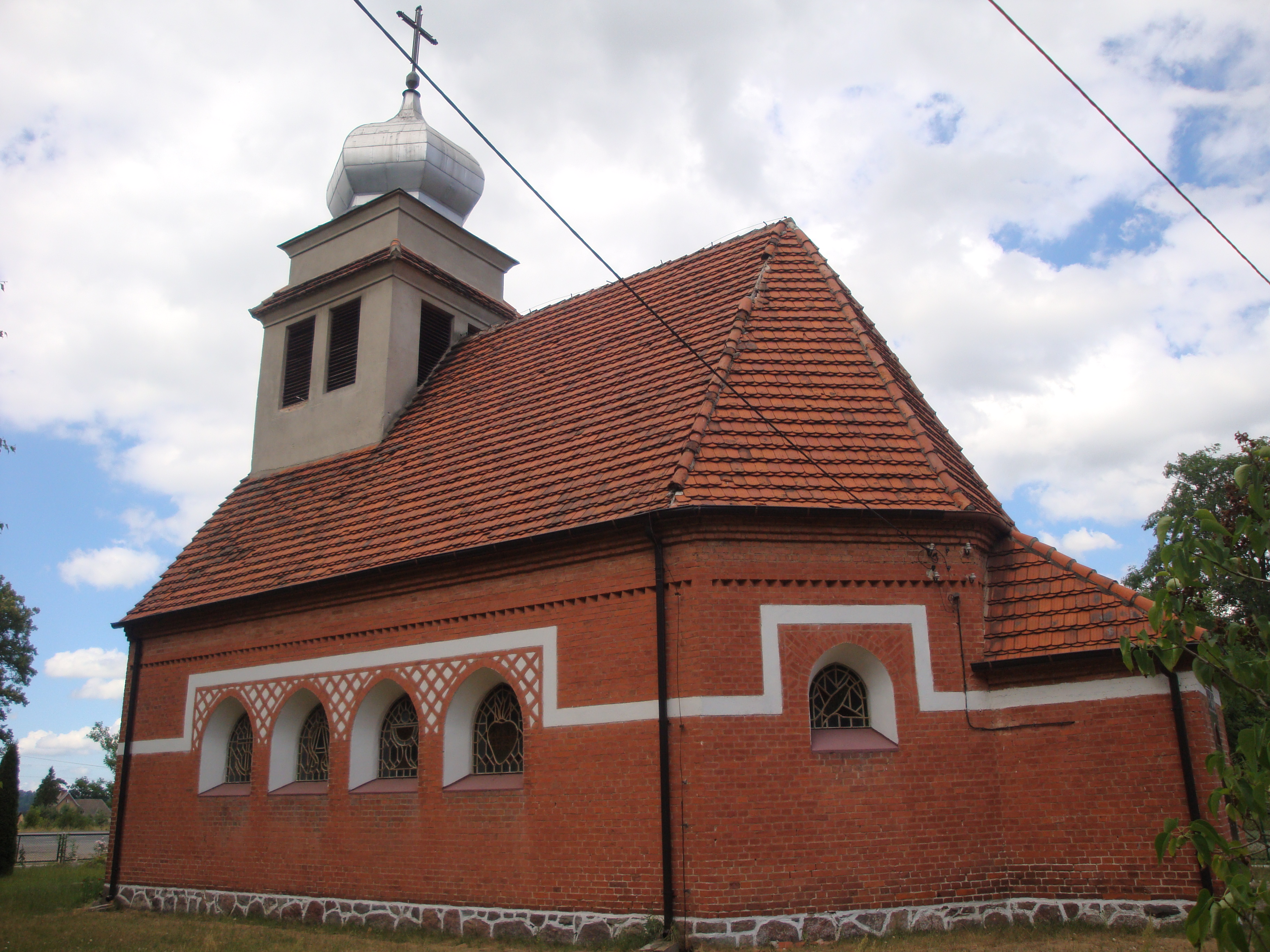
- Church in Leśnice

- Location within Poland
- Coordinates: 54°30′50″N 17°39′39″E
- Country: Poland
- Voivodeship: Pomeranian
- County: Lębork
- Gmina: Nowa Wieś Lęborska
- Population: 472

Leśnice [lɛɕˈnit͡sɛ] is a village in the administrative district of Gmina Nowa Wieś Lęborska, within Lębork County, Pomeranian Voivodeship, in northern Poland.

== Transport ==
The S6 expressway passes directly to the south of Leśnice. Exit 43 of the expressway provides quick access to Lębork and to Słupsk.

Leśnice is served by Leśnice railway station on the Gdańsk-Szczecin railway line.

The nearest airport is Gdańsk Lech Wałęsa (99km to the south-east).

== History ==
For details of the history of the region, see History of Pomerania.
