= Oskowo =

- Village
- Location within Poland
- Coordinates: 54°23′46″N 17°41′54″E
- Country: Poland
- Voivodeship: Pomeranian
- County: Lębork
- Gmina: Cewice
- Population: 211

Oskowo [ɔsˈkɔvɔ] (German: Wutzkow) is a village in the administrative district of Gmina Cewice, within Lębork County, Pomeranian Voivodeship, in northern Poland.

For details of the history of the region, see History of Pomerania.
