= Garczegorze =

- Village
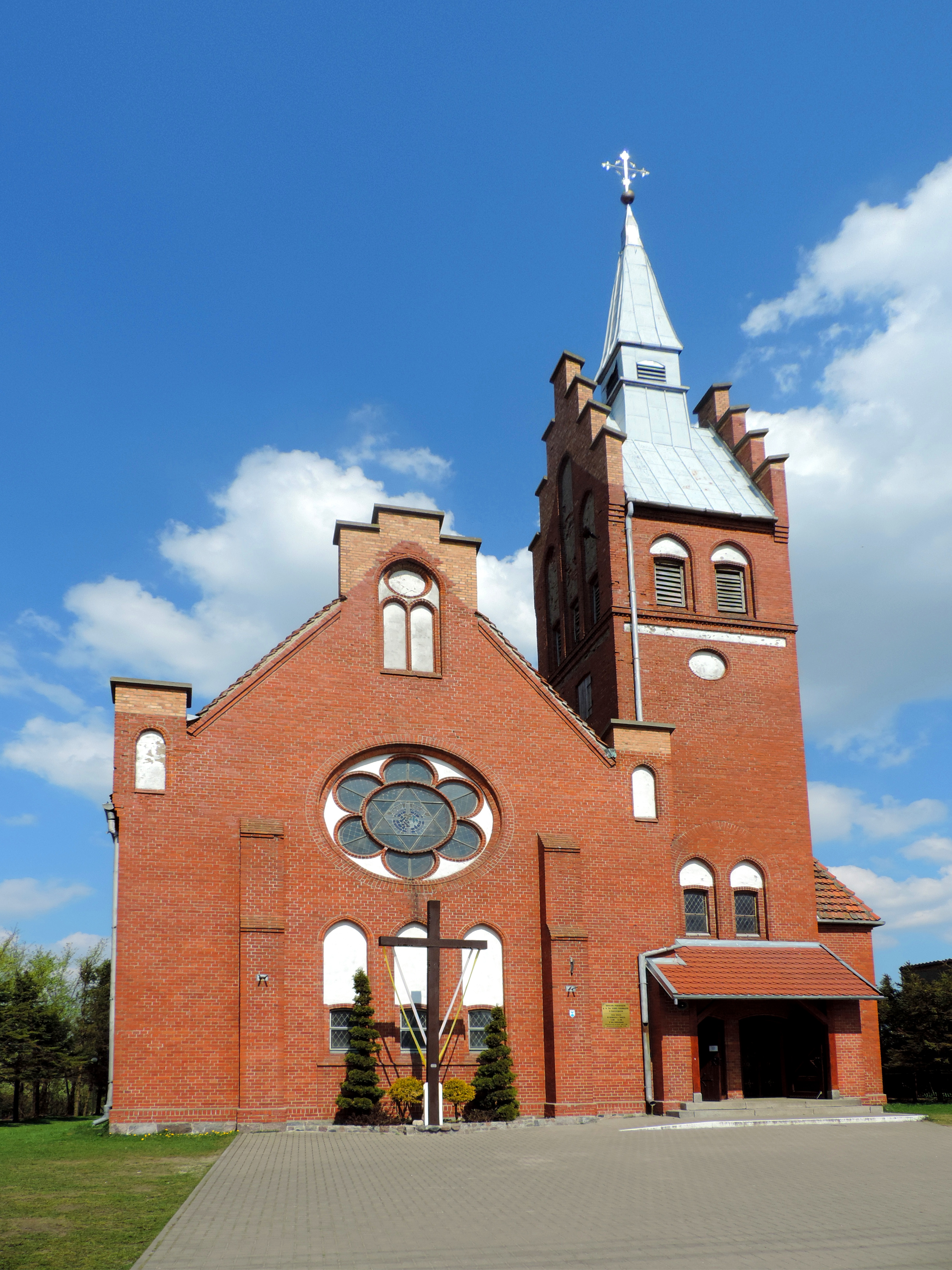
- Mary Magdalene church in Garczegorze

- Location within Poland
- Coordinates: 54°35′44″N 17°43′28″E
- Country: Poland
- Voivodeship: Pomeranian
- County: Lębork
- Gmina: Nowa Wieś Lęborska
- Population: 364

Garczegorze [ɡart͡ʂɛˈɡɔʐɛ] (German: Garzigar) is a village in the administrative district of Gmina Nowa Wieś Lęborska, within Lębork County, Pomeranian Voivodeship, in northern Poland.

For details of the history of the region, see History of Pomerania.

== See also ==
- A Roman Catholic Church, the Parish church st. Mary Magdalene, 1897, registration number: A-1720 of December 13, 2000
