= Łebień, Lębork County =

Łebień
- Village
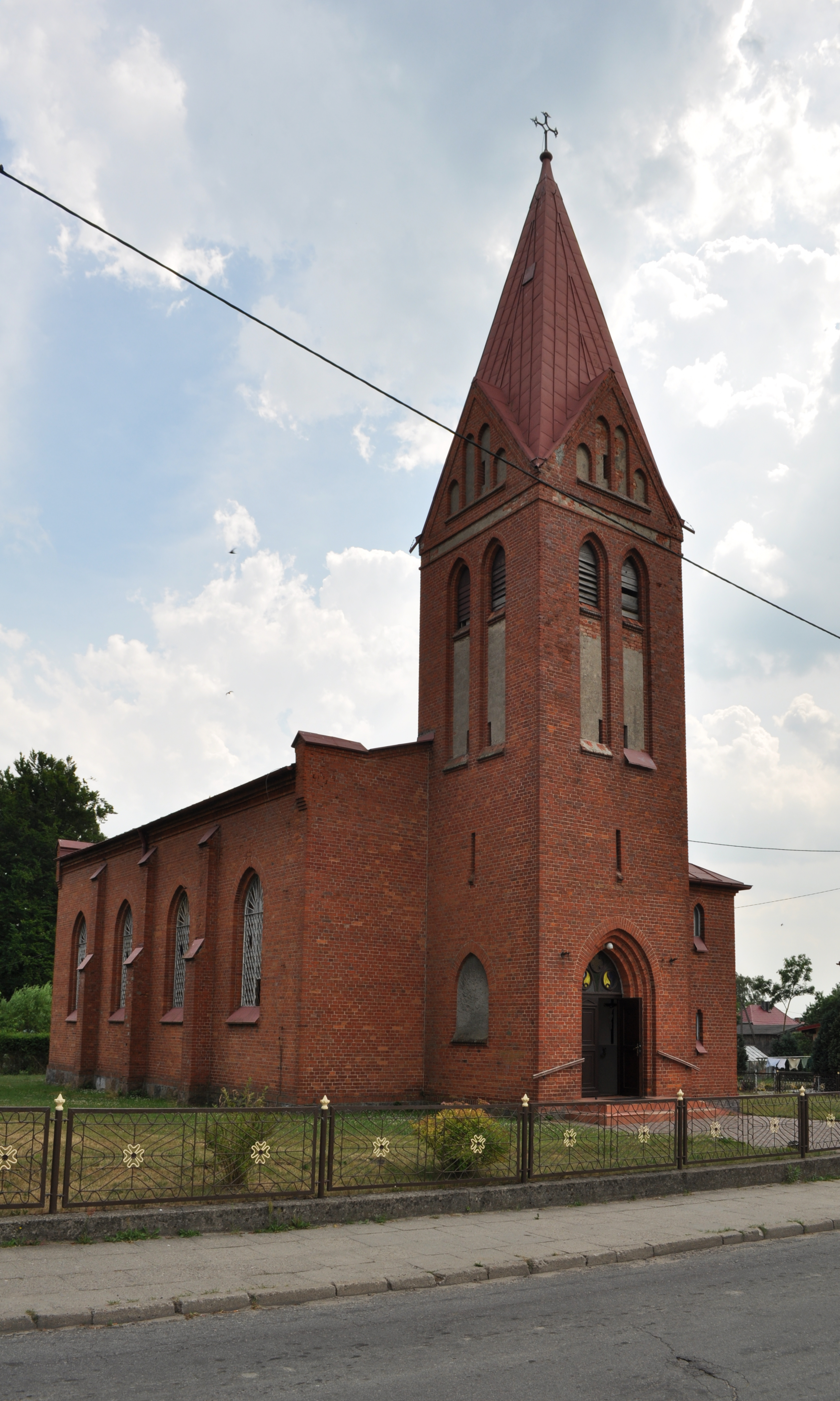
- Church in Łebień

- Location within Poland
- Coordinates: 54°38′39″N 17°43′2″E
- Country: Poland
- Voivodeship: Pomeranian
- County: Lębork
- Gmina: Nowa Wieś Lęborska
- Population: 960

Łebień [ˈwɛbjɛɲ] is a village in the administrative district of Gmina Nowa Wieś Lęborska, within Lębork County, Pomeranian Voivodeship, in northern Poland.

For details of the history of the region, see History of Pomerania.

== Notable residents ==
- Carl von Tiedemann (1878–1979), German General
