= Gmina Cewice =

Gmina Cewice Cewice Commune
- Gmina
- Coat of arms
- Interactive map of Gmina Cewice
- Coordinates (Cewice): 54°26′11″N 17°44′7″E
- Country: Poland
- Voivodeship: Pomeranian
- County: Lębork
- Seat: Cewice

Area
  - Total: 187.86 km^{2} (72.53 sq mi)

Population (2006)
  - Total: 6,891
  - Density: 36.68/km^{2} (95.00/sq mi)
- Website: http://www.cewice.pl/

Gmina Cewice (Kashubian: Céwice) is a rural gmina (administrative district) in Lębork County, Pomeranian Voivodeship, in northern Poland. Its seat is the village of Cewice, which lies approximately 13 kilometres (8 mi) south of Lębork and 59 km (37 mi) west of the regional capital Gdańsk.

The gmina covers an area of 187.86 square kilometres (72.5 sq mi), and as of 2006 its total population is 6,891.

== Villages ==
Gmina Cewice contains the villages and settlements of Bukowina, Cewice, Dziechno, Kamieniec, Karwica, Krępkowice, Krępkowo, Łebunia, Lesiaki, Leśnik, Malczyce, Maszewo Lęborskie, Okalice, Oskowo, Osowiec, Osowo Lęborskie, Pieski, Popowo, Roztopczyn, Siemirowice, Święte, Unieszyniec, Unieszynko and Unieszyno.

== Neighbouring gminas ==
Gmina Cewice is bordered by the town of Lębork and by the gminas of Czarna Dąbrówka, Łęczyce, Linia, Nowa Wieś Lęborska, Potęgowo and Sierakowice.
