= Nowa Wieś Lęborska =

- Village
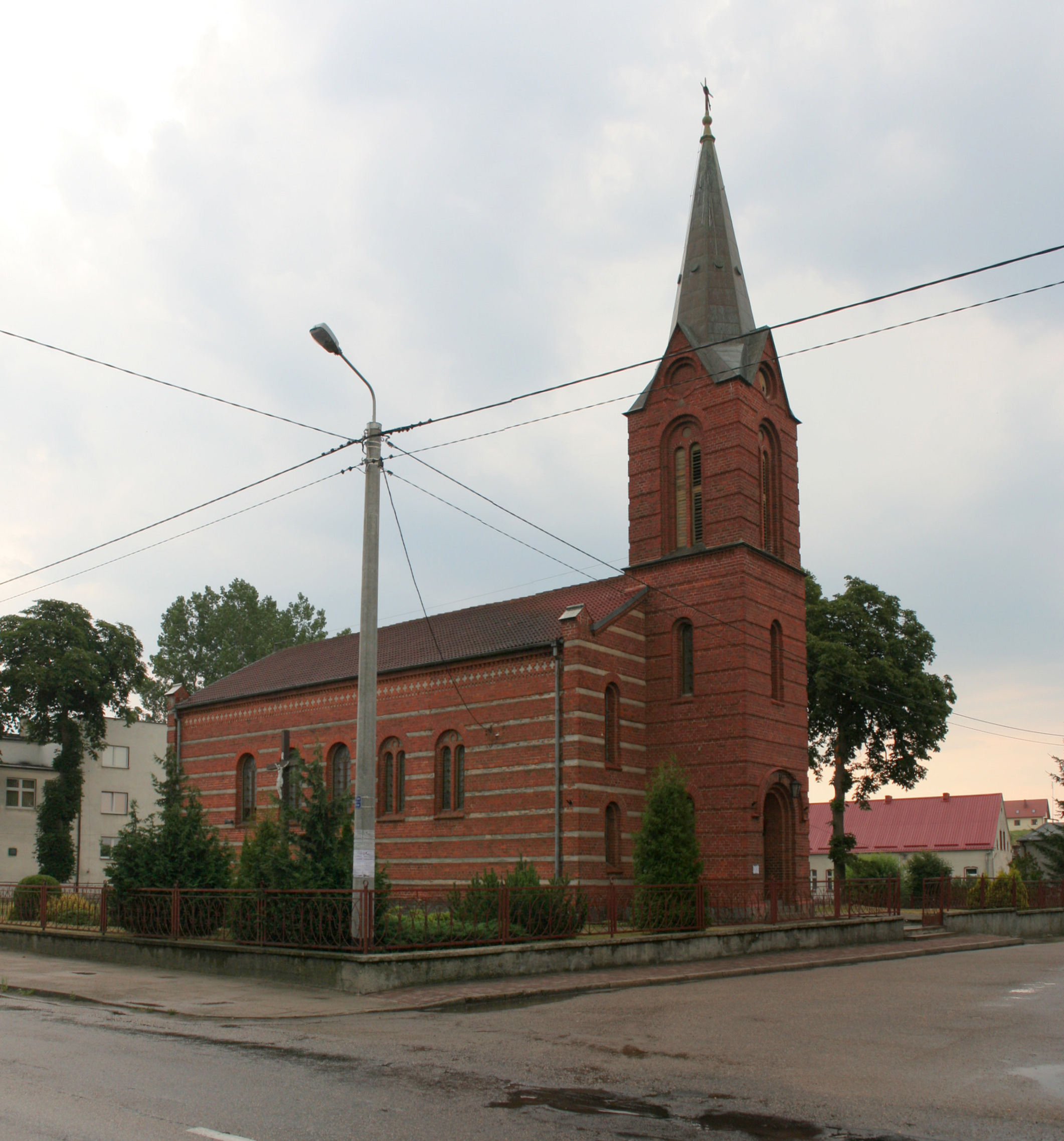
- Church of the Immaculate Conception of the Virgin Mary

- Location within Poland
- Coordinates: 54°33′27″N 17°43′37″E
- Country: Poland
- Voivodeship: Pomeranian
- County: Lębork
- Gmina: Nowa Wieś Lęborska

Population
  - Total: 2,796 (2,022)

Nowa Wieś Lęborska [ˈnɔva ˈvjɛɕ lɛmˈbɔrska] (German: Neuendorf) is a village in Lębork County, Pomeranian Voivodeship, in northern Poland. It is the seat of the gmina (administrative district) called Gmina Nowa Wieś Lęborska.

In the village there is a neo-Romanesque church with a slender tower and apse and a former half-timbered inn, both buildings from the mid-19th century.

For details of the history of the region, see History of Pomerania.
