= Friedrich Bogislav von Tauentzien =

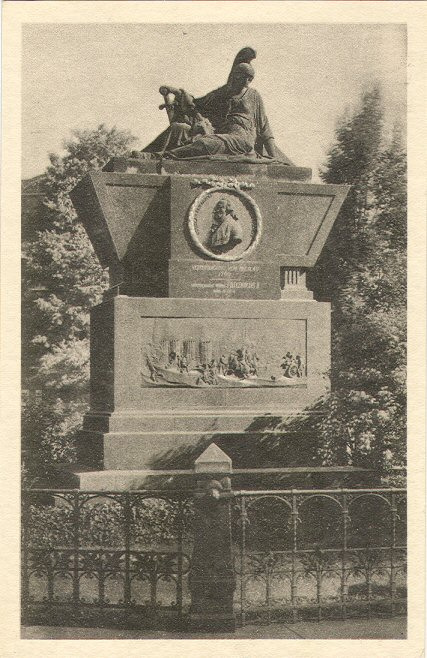
The former funerary monument of Tauentzien in Breslau (Wrocław).

Friedrich Bogislav von Tauentzien (18 April 1710 – 21 March 1791) was a Prussian general who served during the wars of King Frederick the Great.

== Biography ==
Tauentzien hailed from the von Tauentzien family and was born in the village of Tauentzien near Lauenburg in Farther Pomerania. He participated throughout the Silesian Wars. Tauentzien fought alongside Frederick in many of the king's great battles, including Mollwitz, the capture of Prague, Hohenfriedberg, and Kolin. He distinguished himself during the defense of Breslau against Ernst Gideon Freiherr von Laudon in 1760 during the Seven Years' War.

Tauentzien married Charlotte von dem Knesebeck, with whom he had two sons and four daughters. One of his sons was Bogislav Friedrich Emanuel von Tauentzien, a Prussian general during the Napoleonic Wars.

Tauentzien died in Breslau; his funerary monument was designed by Carl Gotthard Langhans and Johann Gottfried Schadow. It was located in the middle of Breslau's Tauentzienplatz (now Plac Tadeusza Kościuszki) near the Schweidnitz Gate where the general had personally defended against Austrian troops in 1760. The plaza experienced Breslau's densest traffic until 1945. With the transfer of the city to Poland following World War II, the monument was destroyed. The Tauentzien Square was also renamed Tadeusz Kościuszko Square.
