= Cewice =

- Village
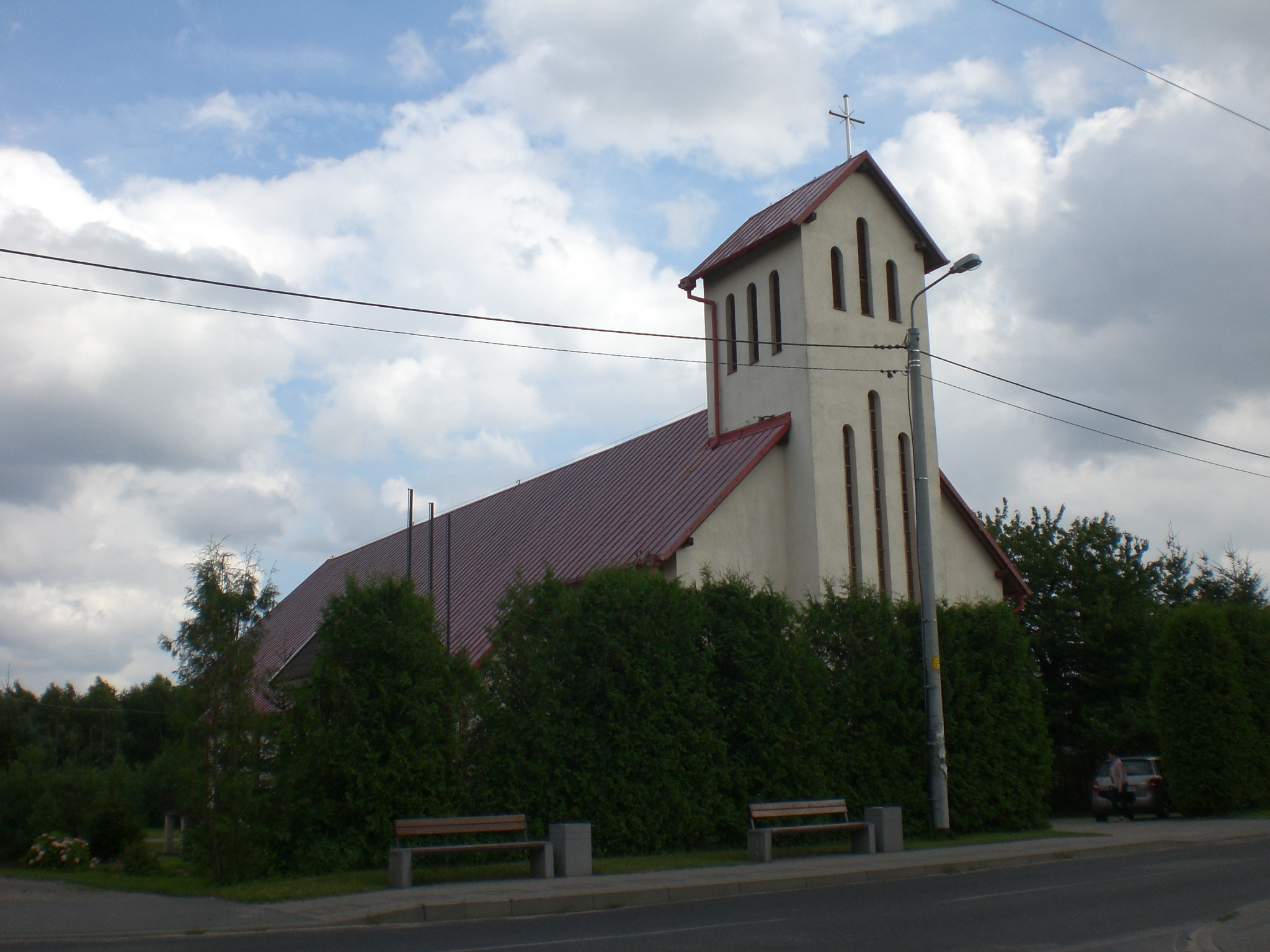
- Church of the Assumption of Mary in Cewice

- Location within Poland
- Coordinates: 54°26′11″N 17°44′7″E
- Country: Poland
- Voivodeship: Pomeranian
- County: Lębork
- Gmina: Cewice
- Population: 1,687
- Time zone: UTC+1 (CET)
  - Summer (DST): UTC+2 (CEST)
- Vehicle registration: GLE

Cewice [t͡sɛˈvit͡sɛ] (German: Zewitz) is a village in Lębork County, Pomeranian Voivodeship, in northern Poland. It is the seat of the gmina (administrative district) called Gmina Cewice. It is located within the ethnocultural region of Kashubia in the historic region of Pomerania.

During the German occupation of Poland (World War II), in 1939, the Germans murdered Polish priest, activist and founder of the Polska Żyje Polish resistance organisation, Edmund Roszczynialski, in the village.
