= Tawęcino =

- Village
- Location within Poland
- Coordinates: 54°39′16″N 17°47′36″E
- Country: Poland
- Voivodeship: Pomeranian
- County: Lębork
- Gmina: Nowa Wieś Lęborska
- Population: 304

Tawęcino [tavɛnˈt͡ɕinɔ] (German: Tauenzin) is a village in the administrative district of Gmina Nowa Wieś Lęborska, within Lębork County, Pomeranian Voivodeship, in northern Poland.

== Notable residents ==
- Friedrich Bogislav von Tauentzien (1710–1791), German general
