= Garczegorze railway station =

Railway station in Poland

Garczegorze
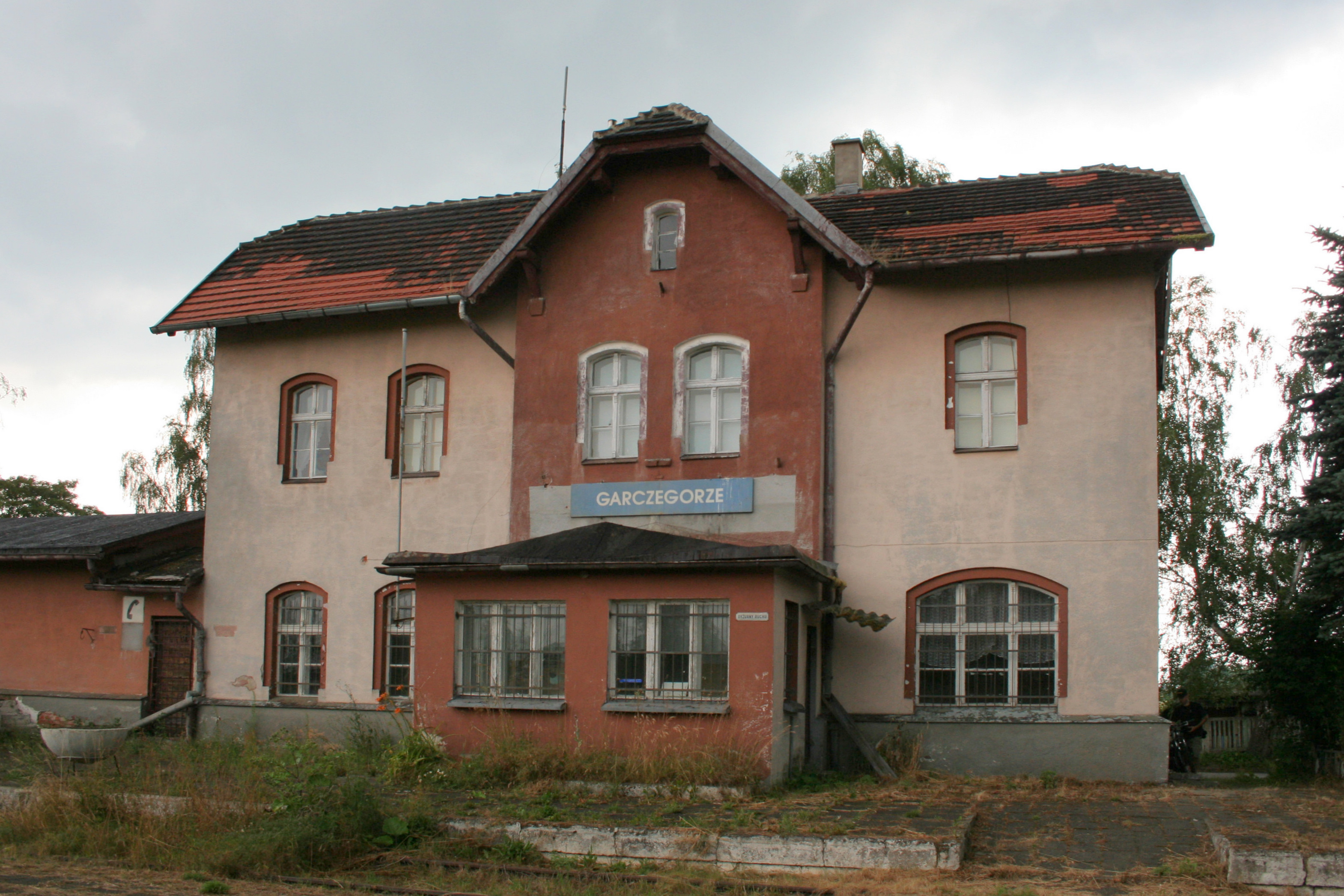

General information
- Location: Garczegorze; Poland
- Coordinates: 54.589760°N 17.702923°E
- Owner: Polskie Koleje Państwowe S.A.
- Platforms: 3

Construction
- Structure type: Building: Yes (no longer used); Depot: Never existed Water tower: Never existed

History
- Former names: Garzigar until 1945
Location

Garczegorze is a PKP railway station in Garczegorze (Pomeranian Voivodeship), Poland. It forms the western end of the disused PKP rail line 230, and lies on the PKP rail line 229 between Lębork and Łeba.

== Lines crossing the station ==
Start station	End station	Line type
Pruszcz Gdański	Łeba	Passenger/Freight
Wejherowo	Garczegorze	Closed
