= Lębork County =

Lębork County Powiat lęborski
- County
- Flag Coat of arms

- Division into gminas
- Coordinates (Lębork): 54°33′N 17°45′E
- Country: Poland
- Voivodeship: Pomeranian
- Seat: Lębork
- Gminas: Total 5 (incl. 2 urban): Łeba; Lębork; Gmina Cewice; Gmina Nowa Wieś Lęborska; Gmina Wicko

Area
  - Total: 706.99 km^{2} (272.97 sq mi)

Population (2019)
  - Total: 66,196
  - Density: 93.631/km^{2} (242.50/sq mi)
  - Urban: 38,977
  - Rural: 27,219
- Car plates: GLE
- Website: www.powiat-lebork.com

Lębork County (Kashubian: Lãbòrsczi kréz, Polish: powiat lęborski) is a unit of territorial administration and local government (powiat) in Pomeranian Voivodeship, northern Poland, on the Baltic coast. It came into being on January 1, 1999, as a result of the Polish local government reforms passed in 1998. Its administrative seat and largest town is Lębork, which lies 61 kilometres (38 mi) west of the regional capital Gdańsk. The only other town in the county is Łeba, lying 29 km (18 mi) north-west of Lębork.

The county covers an area of 706.99 square kilometres (273.0 sq mi). As of 2019 its total population is 66,196, out of which the population of Lębork is 35,333, that of Łeba is 3,644, and the rural population is 27,219.

Lębork County on a map of the counties of Pomeranian Voivodeship

Lębork County is bordered by Wejherowo County to the east, Kartuzy County to the south-east, Bytów County to the south and Słupsk County to the west. It also borders the Baltic Sea to the north.

== Administrative divisions ==
The county is subdivided into five gminas (two urban and three rural). These are listed in the following table, in descending order of population.

Gmina	Type	Area (km^{2})	Population (2019)	Seat
Lębork	urban	17.9	35,333	
Gmina Nowa Wieś Lęborska	rural	270.4	13,593	Nowa Wieś Lęborska
Gmina Cewice	rural	187.9	7,570	Cewice
Gmina Wicko	rural	216.1	6,056	Wicko
Łeba	urban	14.8	3,644	

== Transport ==
National:

- national road no. 6 state border - Kołbaskowo - Łęgowo (przez Lębork)

Provincial:

- provincial road No. 212 Osowo Lęborskie - Kamionka (via Cewice)
- provincial road No. 213 Słupsk - Celbowo (via Wicko)
- provincial road No. 214 Łeba - Warlubie (via Wicko, Lębork)
