= Żarnowiec Elektrownia Wodna railway station =

Railway station in Żarnowiec, Poland

Coordinates: 54°43′06″N 18°05′27″E

Żarnowiec Elektrownia Wodna

General information
- Location: Czymanowo; Poland
- Owner: Polskie Koleje Państwowe S.A.
- Platforms: None

Construction
- Structure type: Building: No; Depot: No; Water tower: No
Location

Żarnowiec Elektrownia Wodna is a dismantled former PKP railway station intended to serve the Żarnowiec pumped storage power station, It lies on a dismantled branch line from Rybno Kaszubskie railway station to the station intended to serve the never-completed Żarnowiec Nuclear Power Plant. The station is located in Czymanowo near Żarnowiec (Pomeranian Voivodeship), Poland.

== Lines crossing the station ==
Start station	End station	Line type
Rybno Kaszubskie	Żarnowiec Elektrownia Jądrowa	Closed
