= Wejherowo–Garczegorze railway =

Railway line in Poland

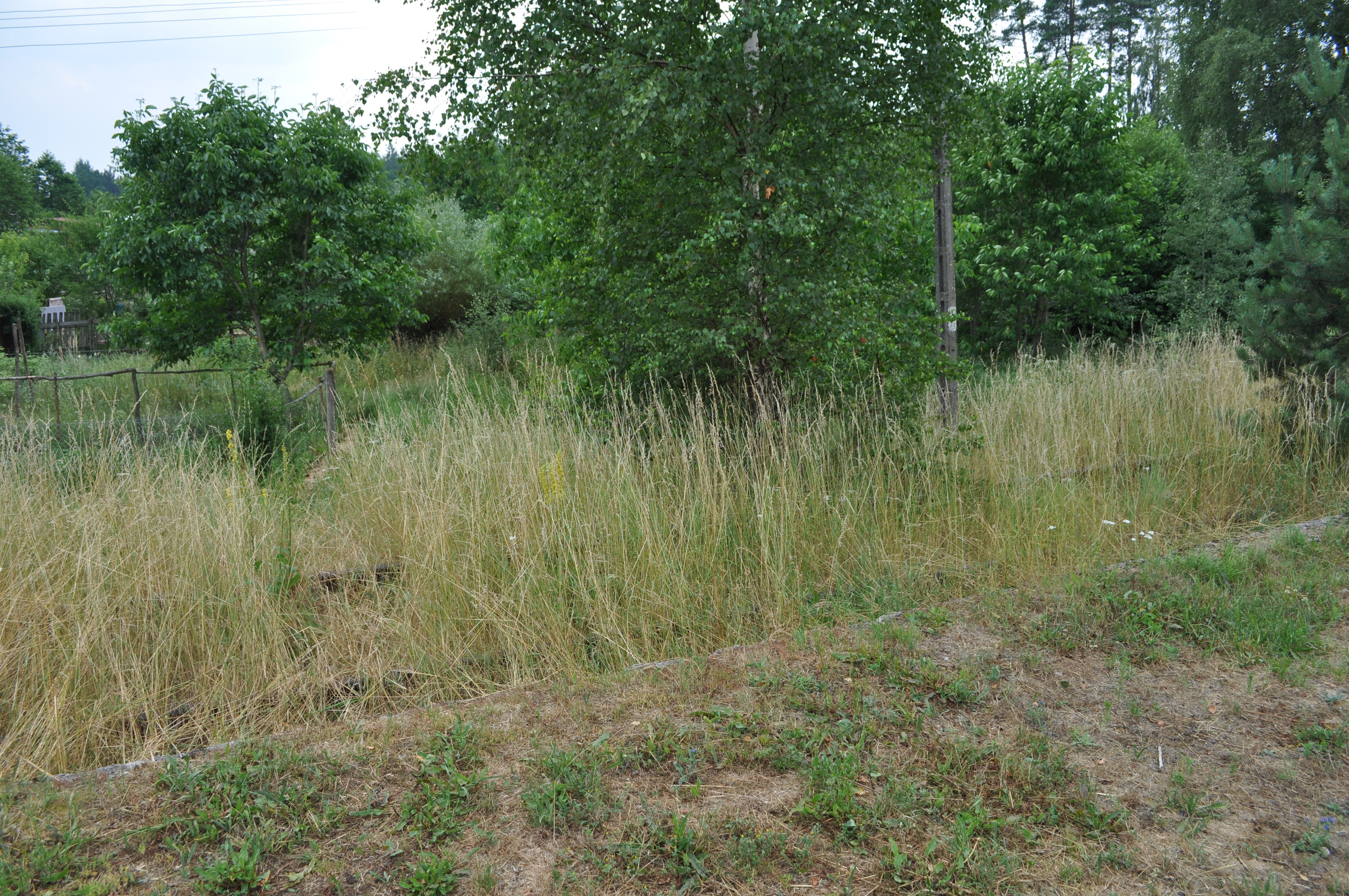
- Remains of PKP rail line 230 at Obliwice, July 2010

Overview
- Owner: PKP Polskie Linie Kolejowe

Service
- Operator(s): PKP, SKM Trójmiasto

History
- Opened: 1902
- Completed: 1910
- Closed: 2001

Technical
- Line length: 63.4 km (39.4 mi)
- Number of tracks: PKP 230
- Track gauge: 1,435 mm (4 ft 8 1/2 in) standard gauge
- Electrification: 3 kV DC (1986–2001)

The Wejherowo–Garczegorze railway is a non-operational PKP cross-province railway line in northern Poland running from PKP rail line 202 at Wejherowo to PKP rail line 229 at Garczegorze.

Originally lying entirely within Germany, the first section from Wejherowo to Prusewo opened in 1902 with last section to Garczegorze opening in 1910. The line was closed and disassembled in 1919, in the aftermath of World War I, reopening in 1924. Between the end of World War I and the end of World War II, the stations from Garczegorze to Rybno Kaszubskie were in Germany while the five stations from Zamostne to Wejherowo were in Poland. Services ceased during World War II but the line reopened again in 1946. Following World War II the entire line became Polish.

The line was electrified in 1986, but closed to passenger traffic in 1992. It closed to freight traffic in 2001. The railway tracks remain in place, but years of neglect mean the line is currently impassable.

A dismantled branch line, rail line 230A, ran from Rybno Kaszubskie railway station to the station intended to serve the never-completed Żarnowiec Nuclear Power Plant, with an intermediate stop at Żarnowiec Elektrownia Wodna railway station which was intended to serve the Żarnowiec Pumped Storage Power Station. The decision to stop the construction of said nuclear power plant in 1990 was a major factor in the downfall of line 230.

In 2002 plans were put forward to re-open the line, to be run by the Gniewino and Choczewo communes, but nothing came out of this.

It has also been suggested that the route of the line could be used to create two regional cycle routes, Route 113 from Wejherowo to Gniewino and Choczewo, and Route 124 from Choczewo to Lębork and Bytów.
