= Rybno Kaszubskie railway station =

Railway station in Pomeranian Voivodeship, Poland

Coordinates: 54°40′19″N 18°05′36″E

Rybno Kaszubskie

General information
- Location: Rybno Kaszubskie; Poland
- Owner: Polskie Koleje Państwowe S.A.
- Platforms: None

Construction
- Structure type: Building: No; Depot: No; Water tower: No

History
- Former names: Rieben until 1945
Location

Rybno Kaszubskie is a non-operational PKP railway station on the disused PKP rail line 230 in Rybno Kaszubskie (Pomeranian Voivodeship), Poland. It is also one end of a dismantled branch line serving the Żarnowiec pumped storage power station power station and the never-completed Żarnowiec Nuclear Power Plant.

== Lines crossing the station ==
Start station	End station	Line type
Wejherowo	Garczegorze	Closed
Rybno Kaszubskie	Żarnowiec Elektrownia Jądrowa	Closed
