= Prusewo railway station =

Railway station in Prusewo, Poland

Prusewo

General information
- Location: Prusewo; Poland
- Coordinates: 54.757813°N 17.985697°E
- Owner: Polskie Koleje Państwowe S.A.
- Platforms: None

Construction
- Structure type: Building: Never existed Depot: Never existed Water tower: Never existed

History
- Former names: Prüssau until 1945
Location

Prusewo is a non-operational PKP railway station on the disused PKP rail line 230 in Prusewo (Pomeranian Voivodeship), Poland.

== Lines crossing the station ==
Start station	End station	Line type
Wejherowo	Garczegorze	Closed
