= Goszczyno =

Goszczyno may refer to the following places:

- Goszczyno, Masovian Voivodeship (east-central Poland)
- Goszczyno, Puck County in Pomeranian Voivodeship (north Poland)
- Goszczyno, Słupsk County in Pomeranian Voivodeship (north Poland)
