= Górczyn =

Górczyn may refer to the following places in Poland:

- Górczyn, part of the Grunwald district of Poznań
- Górczyn, Puck County in Pomeranian Voivodeship
- Górczyn, West Pomeranian Voivodeship

== See also ==
- Gorczyn
