= Biały Kamień =

Bialy Kamien may refer to:

- Paide, Estonia
- Bilyi Kamin, Lviv Oblast, Ukraine
- Biały Kamień, Wałbrzych, a district of the city of Wałbrzych, Poland
- Biały Kamień, a glacial erratic near Połchówko, Gmina Krokowa, Puck County, Pomeranian Voivodeship, Poland
