= Żarnowiec =

- Village
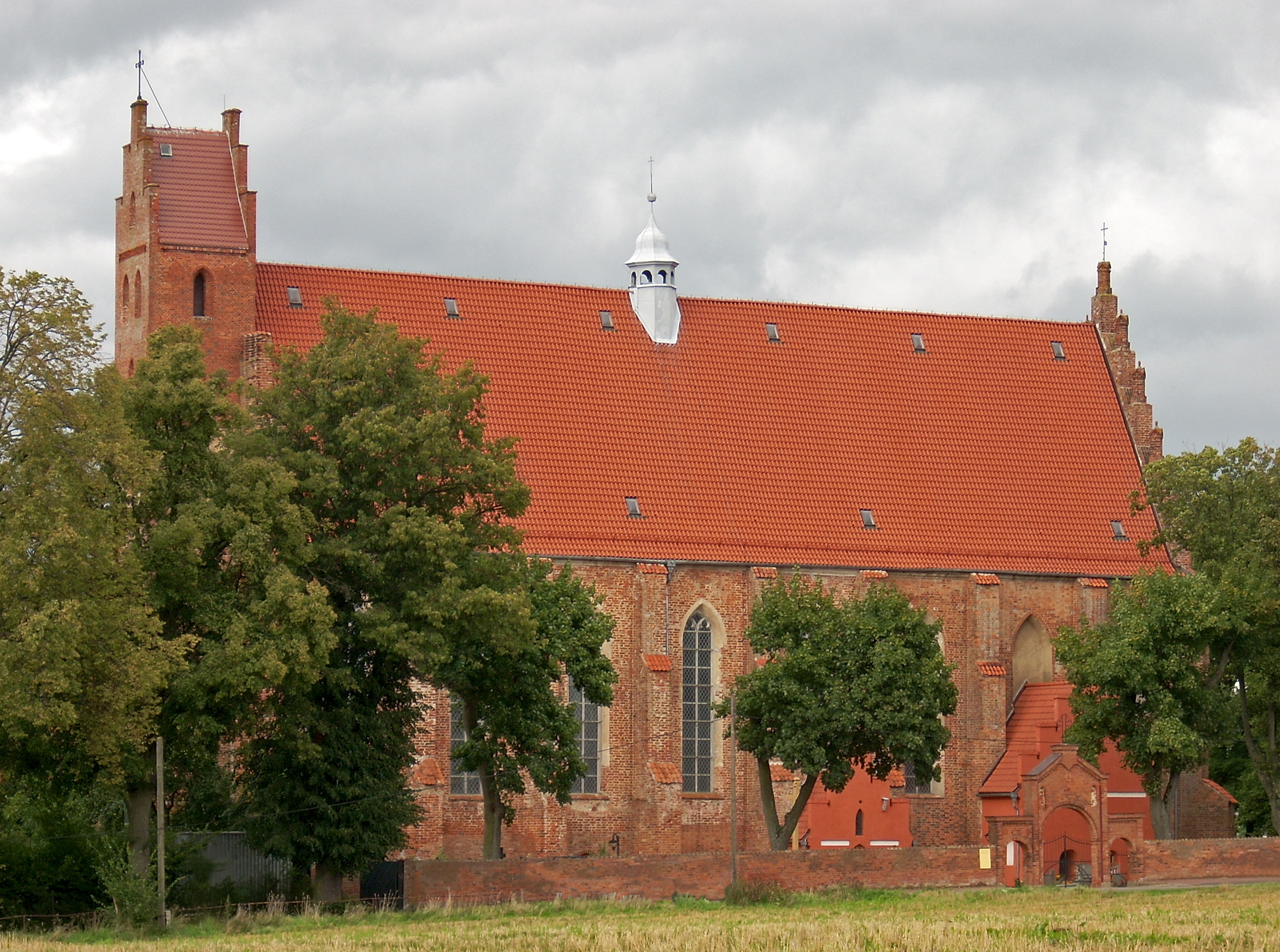
- Gothic Church of the Annunciation in Żarnowiec

- Location within Poland
- Coordinates: 54°47′14″N 18°5′16″E
- Country: Poland
- Voivodeship: Pomeranian
- County: Puck
- Gmina: Krokowa

Population
  - Total: 861
- Time zone: UTC+1 (CET)
  - Summer (DST): UTC+2 (CEST)
- Vehicle registration: GPU

Żarnowiec [ʐarˈnɔvʲɛt͡s] is a village in the administrative district of Gmina Krokowa, within Puck County, Pomeranian Voivodeship, in northern Poland. In 2005 the village had a population of 861.

Żarnowiec was the location for the first Polish nuclear power plant (Żarnowiec Nuclear Power Plant), but construction was stopped in 1990 due to protests of the local population and lack of funds. Recently, the construction plans are being reconsidered.

== History ==
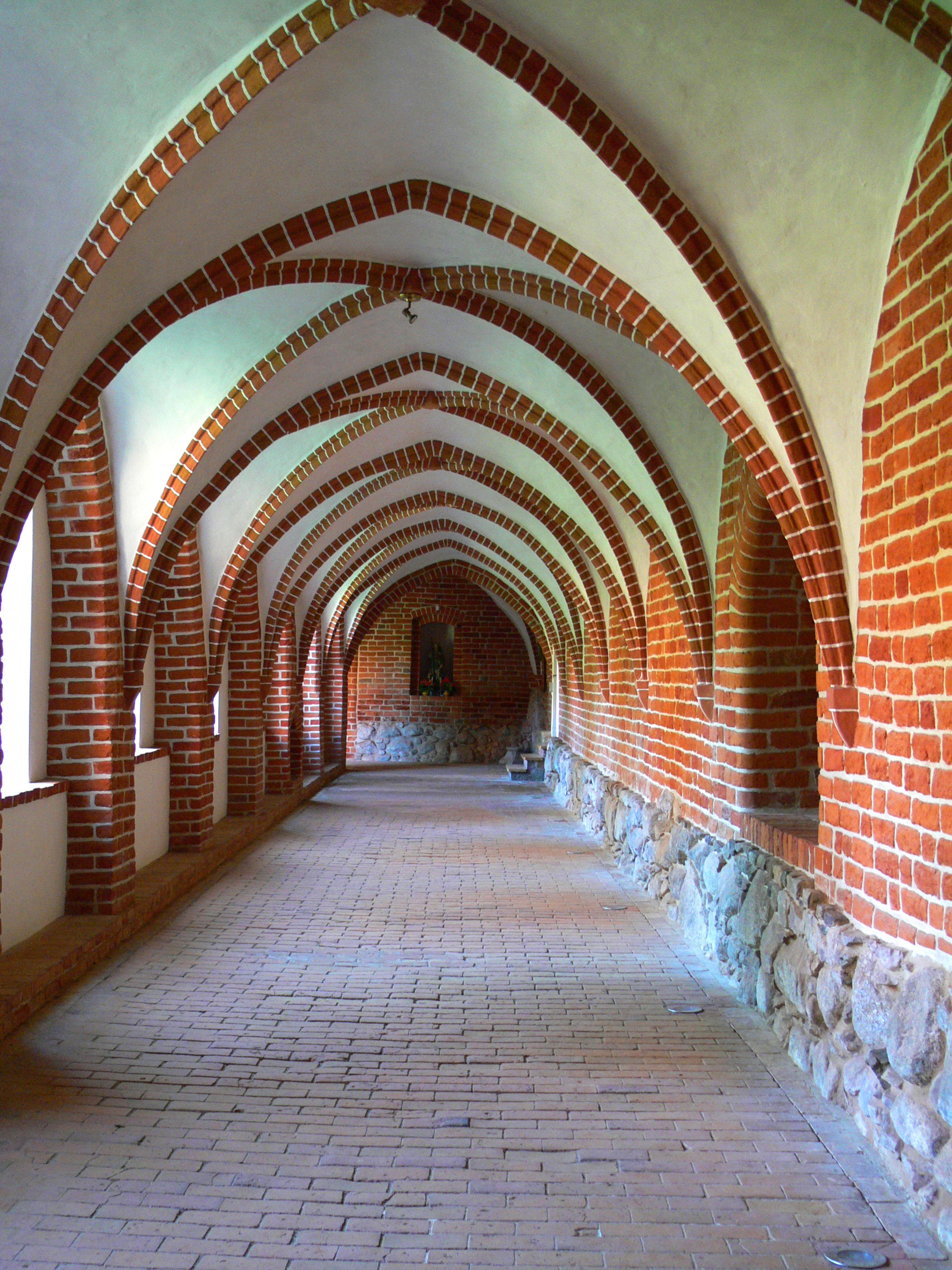
Interior of the monastery in Żarnowiec

The earliest evidence of settlement in the region dates from the 8th century BC: the inhabitants were apparently linked with the Lusatian and East Pomeranian cultures. There was a settlement near the Żarnowiec lake from the seventh to the tenth century AD. A village known alternately as Sarnkow, Sarnowitz, Sarnowicz or Czarnowicz is first mentioned in sources dating from the thirteenth century, when it was inhabited by the Kashubians.

In 1215, Żarnowiec belonged to the Cistercian order based in Oliwa Abbey, which founded a monastery for women there. In the 13th century the local monastery was granted various privileges including ownership of five nearby villages of Kartoszyno, Lubkowo, Odargowo, Świecino, Wierzchucino, what was confirmed by King of Poland Przemysł II in 1295 in Gdańsk. In 1297 the monastery received special economic and juridical privileges from Mściwój II, Duke of Pomerania. It was located within fragmented medieval Poland.

In fourteenth century Żarnowiec, together with all of Pomerelia was annexed from Poland by the Teutonic Order. In 1433, it was raided by a Hussite army. In 1454 the territory was formally re-incorporated into the Kingdom of Poland by King Casimir IV Jagiellon. In 1462, during the subsequent Thirteen Years' War, the Polish army under Piotr Dunin defeated the Teutonic Knights there (see Battle of Świecino, also known as the Battle of Żarnowiec). After the war Żarnowiec was confirmed as part of Poland, and administratively was included in the Pomeranian Voivodeship in the province of Royal Prussia in the Greater Poland Province.

In 1589 Kuyavian Bishop and royal secretary Hieronim Rozdrażewski granted the monastery to a female order of Benedictines from Chełmno, who founded an abbey there in 1617. In 1772, after the First Partition of Poland, the village was taken over by Prussia. The population was subjected to anti-Polish policies, including Germanisation. In 1810 Prussians prohibited the admission of new nuns to the monastery. In 1833 nuns expelled by the Prussians from Toruń settled in the abbey, however in 1834 the abbey was liquidated. During a rally in Żarnowiec in 1911, Prussians arrested a prominent Polish independence activist in Gdańsk Pomerania and local Kashubian activist Antoni Abraham, who was afterwards sentenced to six weeks in prison in Gdańsk for resisting arrest. The village was restored to Poland in 1919, after the country regained independence after World War I. The monastery was refounded in 1946 by a female order of Benedictines, resettled from Vilnius from former eastern Poland annexed by the Soviet Union in World War II.
