= Antoni Abraham =

Polish politician and Kashubian activist (1869–1923)

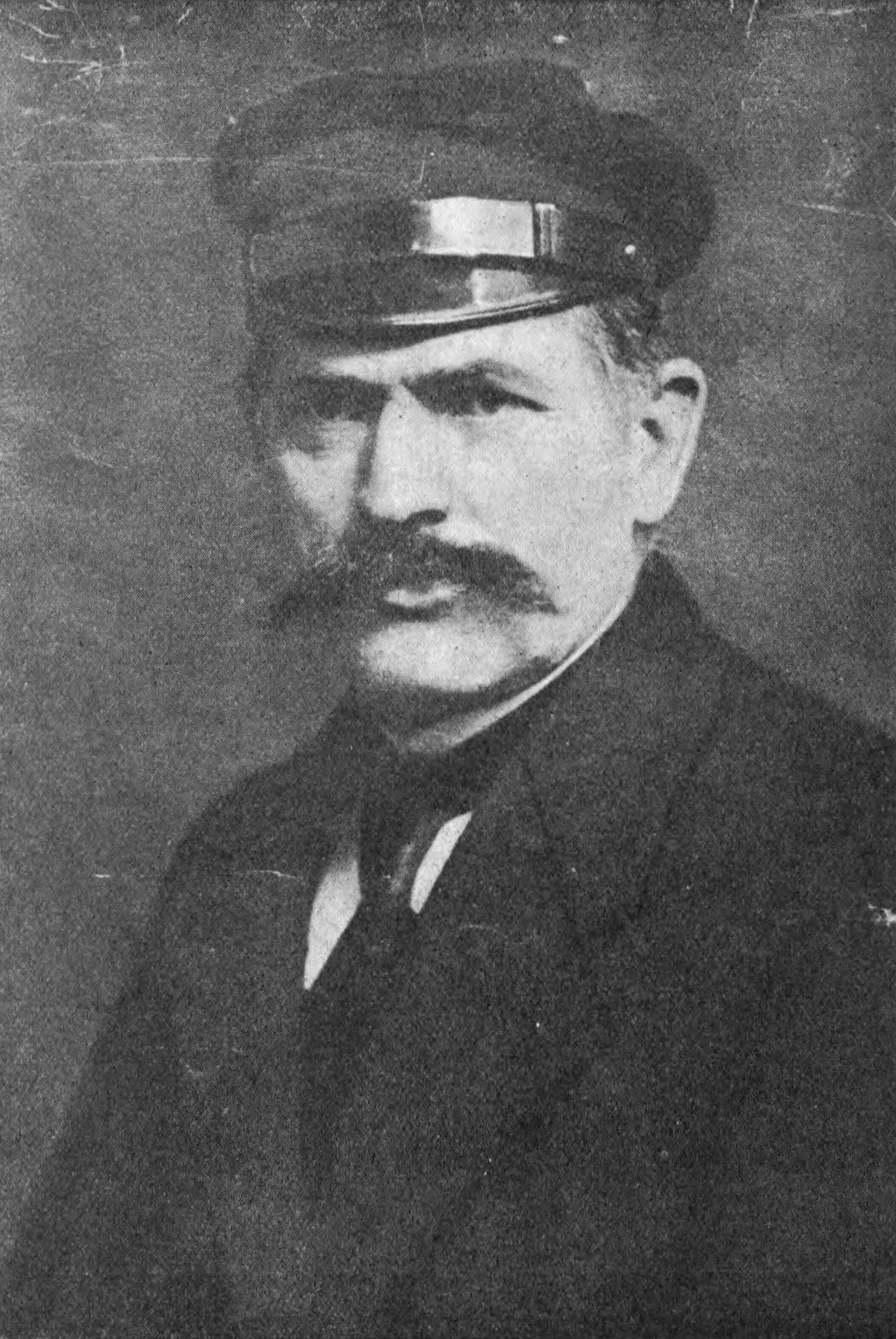

Antoni Abraham (Kashubian: Tóna Ôbram; December 19, 1869, Zdrada - June 23, 1923) was a Polish promoter of Pomeranian culture, Kashubian activist and popular writer. He is popularly known as the “King of the Kashubians” (Król Kaszubów).

== Early life ==
Abraham was born in the village of Zdrada near Mechowo into a poor family. His father, Jan Abraham, was a landless agricultural laborer, and his mother was Franciszka née Czapówna. He attended elementary schools in Mechowo and Leśniewo. His national and religious outlook was influenced by Father Teofil Bączkowski, the parish priest in Mechowo.

After his father's death when Abraham was 16, he worked at various temporary jobs throughout Kashubia, including on farms and in forestry, fishing, and industry. He also worked for a time as a traveling salesman of Singer sewing machines.

Around 1889, he married Matylda Paszke of Pryśniewo. They had five children, although one daughter died young. Both of their sons later served in the Prussian army during the First World War and died from wounds.

The family lived in several places, including Orle and the area around Sopot. Abraham worked as a porter, driver, and craftsman and eventually built a house in Sopot, where he lived from 1903 to 1908.

== Social engagement and work in Kashubia ==
From the 1890s, Abraham participated in Polish social and cultural activities in Gdańsk and the surrounding region. In 1908, while living in Sopot, he signed a promissory note guaranteeing the debts of a German acquaintance. When the debts were not repaid, Abraham became responsible for them and suffered severe financial losses, eventually losing his property in Sopot. The experience has been regarded as an important factor in the development of his later political activism, although there is no evidence of significant agitation by Abraham before this period.

In 1909, Abraham moved to Oliwa, then part of the German Empire, and found employment with Singer u. Neidlinger, a manufacturer of sewing machines and bicycles. Working as a travelling salesman, he travelled throughout Kashubia, promoting Polish national consciousness and distributing the Gazeta Gdańska, to which he also contributed articles.

Abraham organised public meetings, frequently outside churches after Sunday Mass. He criticised the Prussian administration, encouraged the reading of Polish newspapers and urged Kashubians to become more active in defending their national identity. One of his best-known slogans was: “Elementarz, książka, gazeta – to polskiego domu zaleta” (“A primer, a book, a newspaper—the pride of a Polish home”).

His activities brought him into repeated conflict with the Prussian authorities. He was subjected to fines, arrests and other forms of harassment. In 1911, in Żarnowiec, he resisted arrest and reportedly broke the handcuffs placed on him by gendarmes. He was sentenced to six weeks in prison in Gdańsk.

In August 1910, Abraham and other Polish activists founded the Jedność (“Unity”) People's Society in Puck. Similar organisations were subsequently established in several other Kashubian communities, including Reda, Wejherowo and Kościerzyna. Abraham served as chairman of the society in Reda from 1911 to 1913.
