= Żarnowiec Elektrownia Jądrowa railway station =

Railway station in Żarnowiec, Poland

Coordinates: 54°44′24″N 18°05′57″E

Żarnowiec Elektrownia Jądrowa

General information
- Location: Kartoszyno; Poland
- Owner: Polskie Koleje Państwowe S.A.

Construction
- Structure type: Building: Never existed Depot: Never existed Water tower: Never existed
Location

Żarnowiec Elektrownia Jądrowa is a dismantled former PKP railway station intended to serve the never-completed Żarnowiec Nuclear Power Plant. It lies at one end of a dismantled branch line from Rybno Kaszubskie. It is situated in Kartoszyno near Żarnowiec (Pomeranian Voivodeship), Poland.

== Lines crossing the station ==
Start station	End station	Line type
Rybno Kaszubskie	Żarnowiec Elektrownia Jądrowa	Closed
