= Zamostne railway station =

Railway station in Zamostne, Poland

Coordinates: 54°38′59″N 18°06′13″E

Zamostne

General information
- Location: Zamostne; Poland
- Owner: Polskie Koleje Państwowe S.A.
- Platforms: None

Construction
- Structure type: Building: No; Depot: No; Water tower: No

History
- Former names: Überbück until 1945
Location

Zamostne is a non-operational PKP railway station on the disused PKP rail line 230 in Zamostne (Pomeranian Voivodeship), Poland.

== Lines crossing the station ==
Start station	End station	Line type
Wejherowo	Garczegorze	Closed
