= Sobieńczyce-Myśliwka =

- Village
- Location within Poland
- Coordinates: 54°44′55″N 18°8′57″E
- Country: Poland
- Voivodeship: Pomeranian
- County: Puck
- Gmina: Krokowa

Sobieńczyce-Myśliwka [sɔbjɛɲˈt͡ʂɨt͡sɛ mɨˈɕlifka] is a village in the administrative district of Gmina Krokowa, within Puck County, Pomeranian Voivodeship, in northern Poland.

For details of the history of the region, see History of Pomerania.
