= Battle of Świecino =

1462 battle of the Thirteen Years' War

Coordinates: 54°47′14″N 18°05′16″E

- Part of the Thirteen Years' War
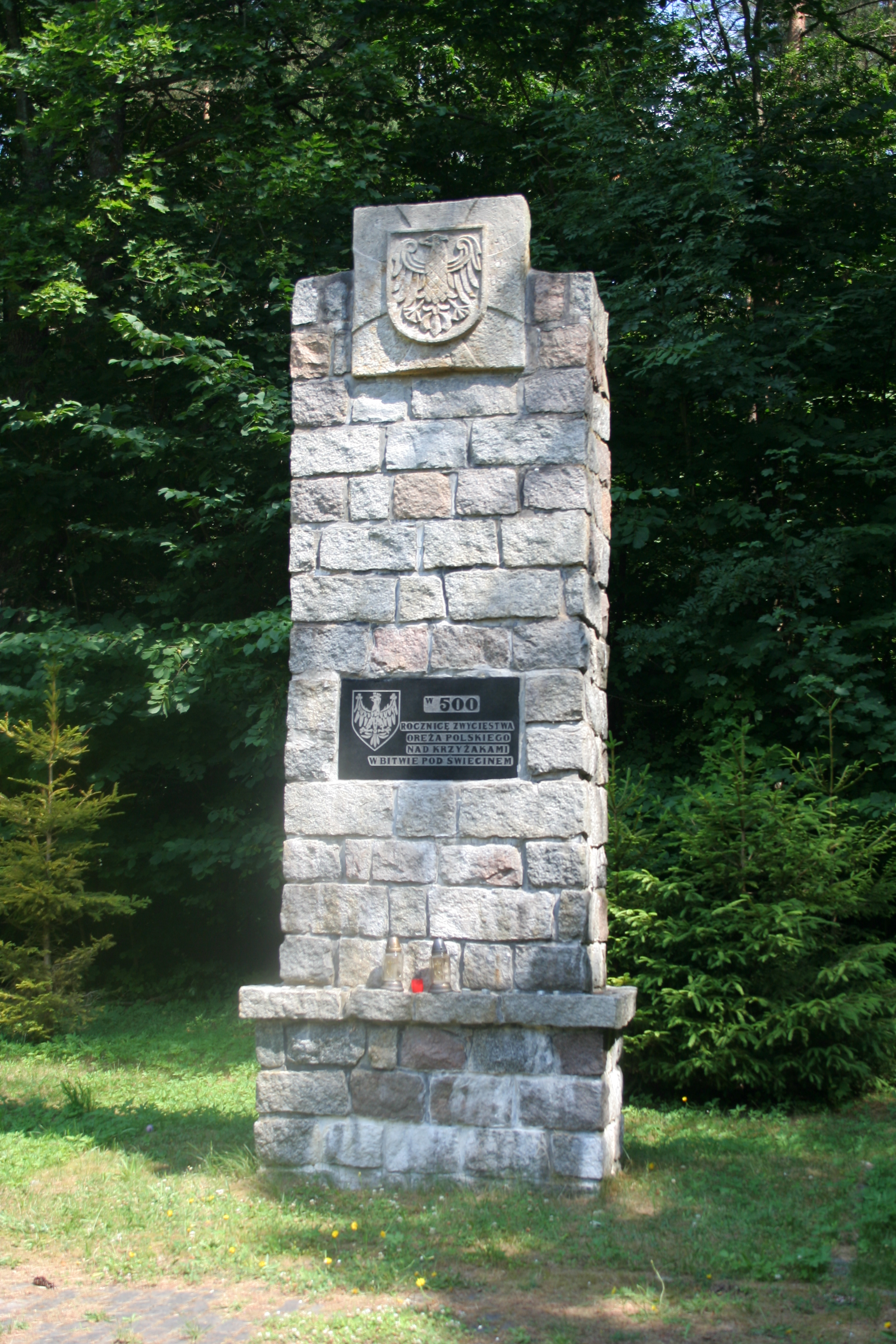
Date	September 17, 1462
Location	Near Krokowa, Poland
Result	Polish victory

Belligerents
Teutonic Order	Polish Crown; Prussian Confederation

Commanders and leaders
Fritz Raweneck †; Kaspar Nostyc; Kaspar von Warnsdorf †; Fritz Hohennest †; Stefan Schönaich †	Piotr Dunin; Maciej Hagen †; Johann Maydenburg †

Strength
2,700	2,000

Casualties and losses
Over 1,000 killed 50 captured	~250

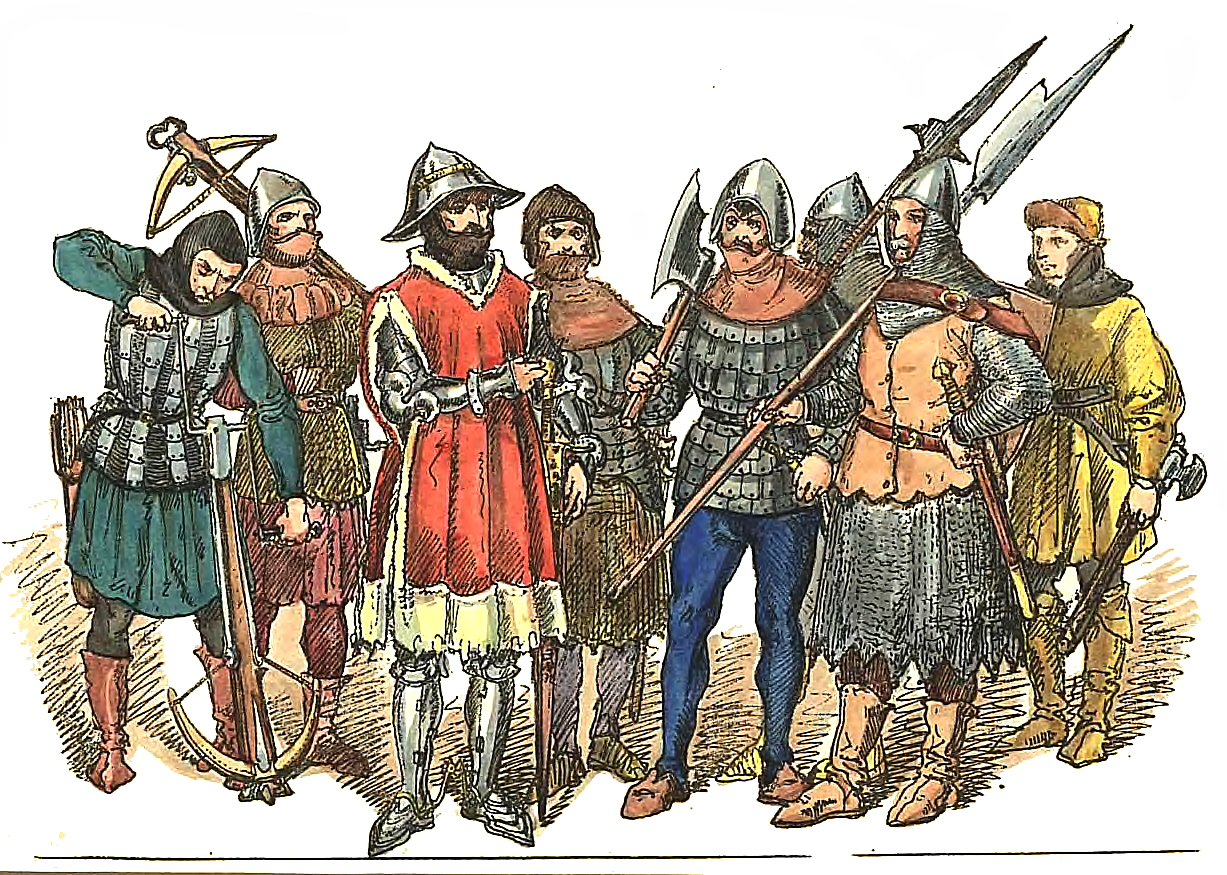
Polish soldiers 1447–1492

The Battle of Świecino (named for the village of Świecino, near Żarnowiec Lake, northern Poland) also called the Battle of Żarnowiec or in German Die Schlacht bei Schwetz, took place on September 17, 1462, during the Thirteen Years' War. The Polish forces, commanded by Piotr Dunin and consisting of some 2,000 mercenaries and Poles, decisively defeated the 2,700-man army of the Teutonic Knights, commanded by Fritz Raweneck and Commander of the Order Kaspar Nostitz (Nostyc). Auxiliary forces sent by Duke Eric II of Pomerania, temporary ally of the Teutonic Knights, did not enter the battle.

== Polish forces ==
The Polish forces consisted mostly of the mercenaries hired by the Polish king, Casimir IV the Jagiellon and the city of Danzig (Gdańsk). This army included 1,000 cavalry, of which 112 were heavy cavalry, and another 1,000 of infantry. 1,000 cavalry and 400 infantry were mercenaries hired by the Polish king, while the rest were units from Danzig (Gdańsk).

== Teutonic forces ==
Most of the Teutonic army, under the command of Fritz Raweneck and Kaspar Nostitz, were troops gathered from the nearby castles Mewe (Gniew), Stargard (Starogard Gdański), Nowe, Skarszewy, and Stara Kiszewa. This army totalled 1,000 cavalry and 400 infantry. Raweneck also had the supply chain (tabors), cannons, and up to 1,300 auxiliary infantry of Pomeranian peasants, used mainly for fortification works.

== Battle ==
The battle started in the evening. Adopting a relatively new tactic, Polish units built a fortified camp on the Hussite model consisting of wagons linked by a chain surrounded by a deep ditch (tabor). The units of Raveneck and his subordinate, Kaspar Nostyc (commander from Conitz (Chojnice)) also created a tabor. Piotr Dunin decided not to wait for the enemy and attacked first, setting infantry with crossbows on the left, defended by cavalry between the tabor and the coast of the nearby lake of Rogoźnica. Raveneck placed cavalry in front of his tabor, and infantry behind it, without any strategic plan. The first phase of the battle was started by a charge of Polish heavy cavalry under Paweł Jasieński. Fierce fighting continued for three hours and ended without a clear winner. After a short pause at midday, Teutonic units were able to push the Poles back; however, they found themselves under very heavy fire from crossbows of the Polish infantry, which caused huge losses and a withdrawal. During this fight Raveneck was wounded. He stopped his soldiers and tried to attack again, but this charge ended with a total defeat – Raveneck died and the rest of the cavalry surrendered or escaped. The Teutonic infantry tried to defend themselves at the tabor but its resistance was broken by a quick attack of Polish cavalry. At the end of the battle, reinforcements of Eric II of Pomerania appeared, however, seeing the defeat of the Teutonic Knights, the Pomeranian prince did not attack, while the Poles attacked, forcing his troops to flee.

== Casualties ==
The Teutonic Order's army lost around 1,000 soldiers, including some 300 cavalrymen. Fifty soldiers were captured. The Teutonic commander was also killed in battle and was buried in the Żarnowiec chapter church.

The Poles lost just 100 soldiers, although 150 later died from their wounds. Among the dead on the Polish side was Maciej Hagen from Gdańsk. Piotr Dunin was wounded twice.

== Aftermath ==
The direct result of the battle of Świecino was that the city of Danzig and Pomerania were freed from the danger of an attack by the Teutonic Order. As a result, the royal and municipal armed forces could be used elsewhere in the war, mainly to protect the Vistula waterway and to capture the Teutonic held strongholds. This way that Teutonic forces in Prussia on the right bank of Vistula were cut off from supplies from Western Europe.

The psychological significance of the battle was that this was the first open field battle won by the royal forces, so it increased the morale of the Polish forces and lowered the morale of the Teutonic Knights. Many military historians say that the battle of Świecino was the turning point of the Thirteen Years' War, leading to the final Polish victory in 1466.
