= Sławoszynko =

- Village
- Location within Poland
- Coordinates: 54°48′30″N 18°11′58″E
- Country: Poland
- Voivodeship: Pomeranian
- County: Puck
- Gmina: Krokowa

Sławoszynko [swavɔˈʂɨnkɔ] is a village in the administrative district of Gmina Krokowa, within Puck County, Pomeranian Voivodeship, in northern Poland.

For details of the history of the region, see History of Pomerania.
