= Glinki, Puck County =

Glinki
- Village
- Location within Poland
- Coordinates: 54°45′34″N 18°8′10″E
- Country: Poland
- Voivodeship: Pomeranian
- County: Puck
- Gmina: Krokowa

Glinki ([ˈɡlinki]; Kashubian: Glinczi; German: Glinke) is a village in the administrative district of Gmina Krokowa, within Puck County, Pomeranian Voivodeship, in northern Poland.

For details of the history of the region, see History of Pomerania.
