= Wierzchucino =

- Village
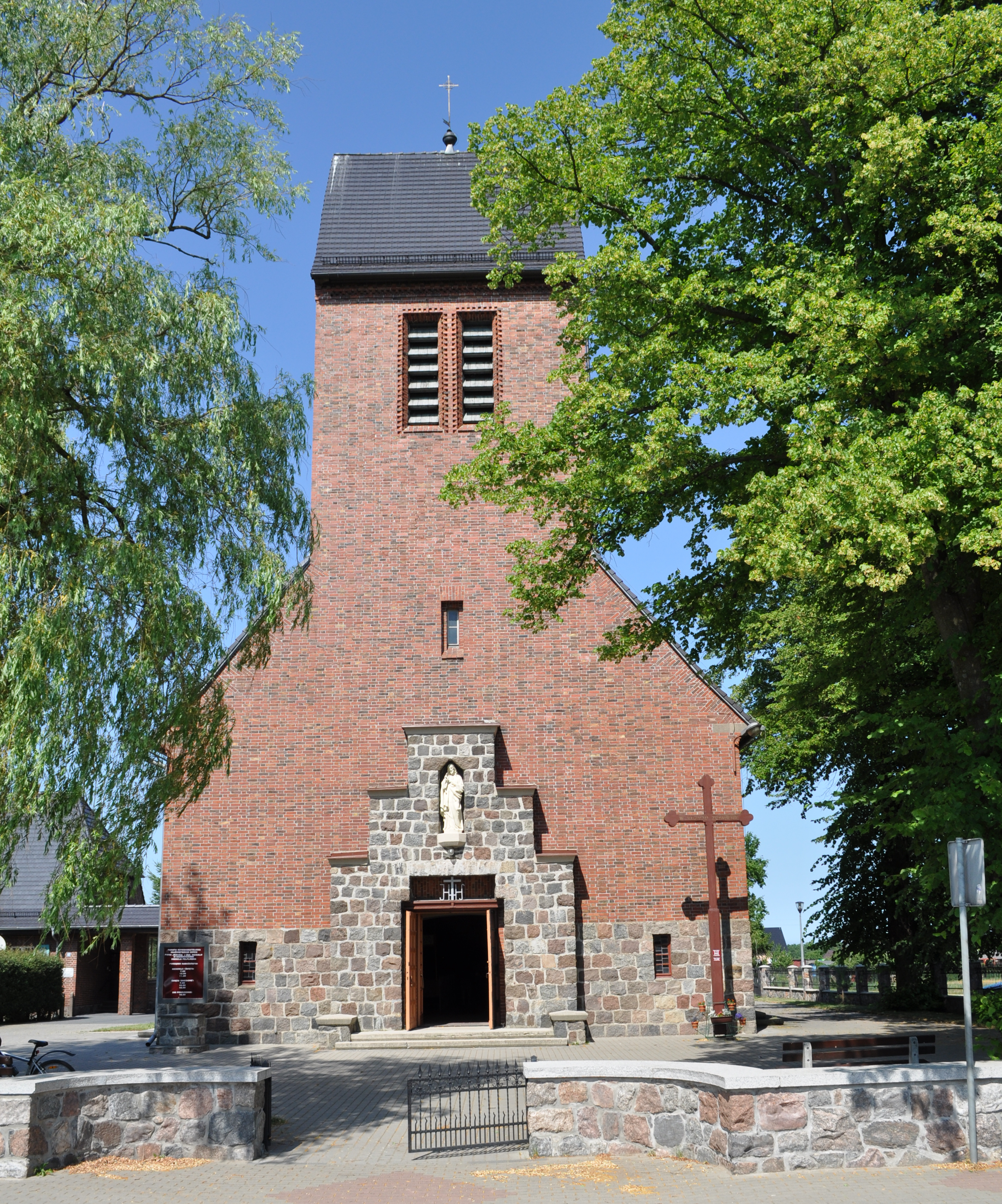
- Sacred Heart church in Wierzchucino

- Location within Poland
- Coordinates: 54°47′15″N 18°0′13″E
- Country: Poland
- Voivodeship: Pomeranian
- County: Puck
- Gmina: Krokowa
- Population: 1,536
- Time zone: UTC+1 (CET)
  - Summer (DST): UTC+2 (CEST)

Wierzchucino [vjɛʂxuˈt͡ɕinɔ]) (German: Wierschutzin) is a village in the administrative district of Gmina Krokowa, within Puck County, Pomeranian Voivodeship, in northern Poland. It is located within the historic region of Pomerania.

In 1257, Wierzchucino was granted by Swietopelk II, Duke of Pomerania to the Cistercian nunnery in Żarnowiec, what was later confirmed in Gdańsk by King of Poland Przemysł II in 1295. In the early modern period (16th-18th centuries) the village had still been property of the nunnery of Żarnowiec. After the First Partition of Poland it was annexed by the Kingdom of Prussia, and from 1871 it was also part of Germany. Administratively it belonged to the Province of Pomerania. During World War II the German occupying administration operated a labor camp for prisoners of war from the Stalag II-B prisoner-of-war camp in the village. After the defeat of Nazi Germany in World War II, in 1945, the village became again part of Poland.

There is a historic Gothic Revival Sacred Heart church in Wierzchucino, and a memorial to Polish-Kashubian activist Antoni Miotk.
