= Karwieńskie Błoto Pierwsze =

- Village
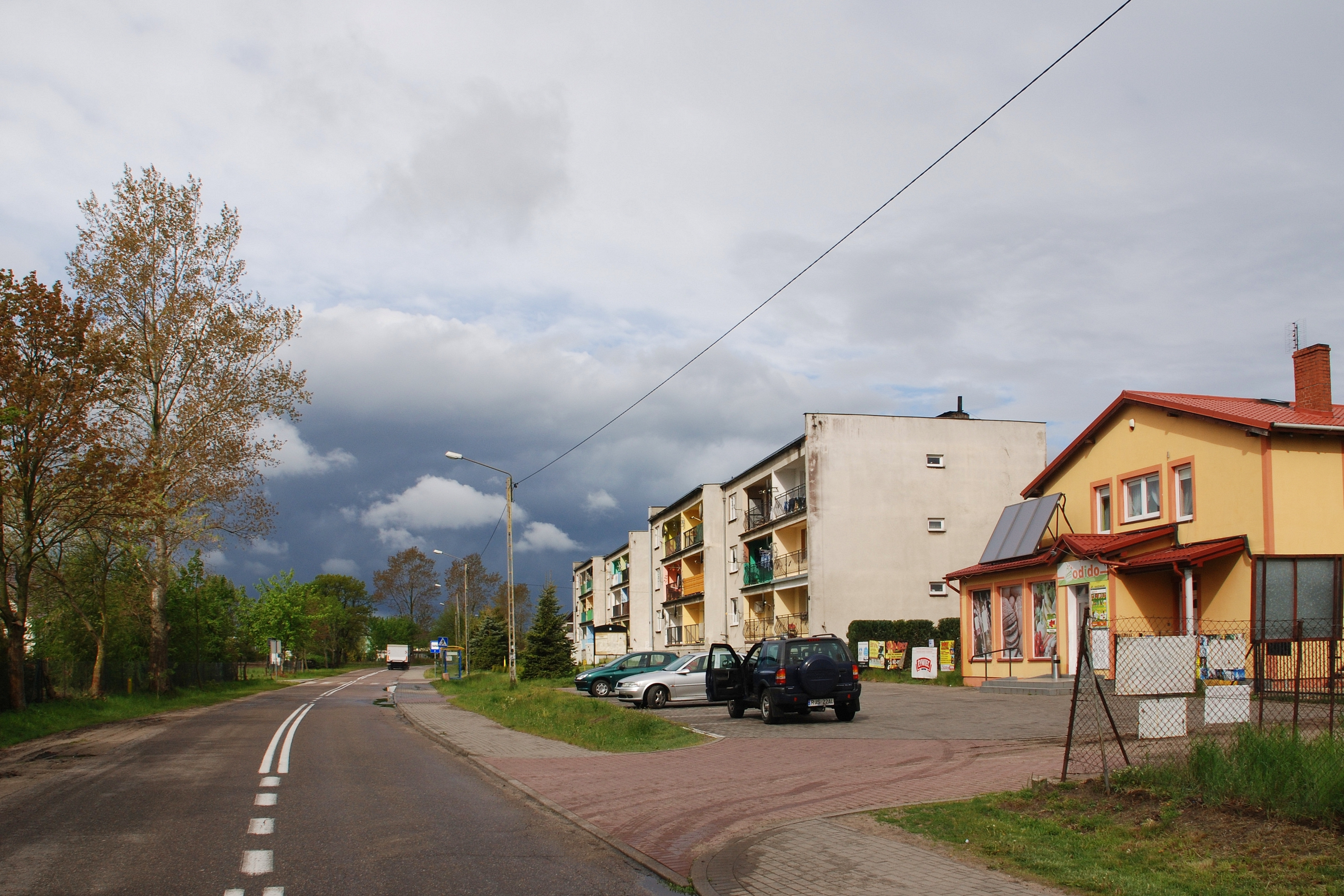

- Location within Poland
- Coordinates: 54°48′37″N 18°11′45″E
- Country: Poland
- Voivodeship: Pomeranian
- County: Puck
- Gmina: Krokowa

Population
  - Total: 374
- Time zone: UTC+1 (CET)
  - Summer (DST): UTC+2 (CEST)
- Vehicle registration: GPU

Karwieńskie Błoto Pierwsze [karˈvjɛɲskʲɛ ˈbwɔtɔ ˈpjɛrfʂɛ] is a village in the administrative district of Gmina Krokowa, within Puck County, Pomeranian Voivodeship, in northern Poland.

== History ==
Karwieńskie Błoto Pierwsze and Karwieńskie Błoto Drugie once formed one village of Karwieńskie Błoto. In the 1590s, starost of Puck Jan Wejher brought Dutch immigrants to the village, and granted them 55 włókas of land. In 1604, they built a school. In 1666, the village suffered a flood.
