= Gmina Krokowa =

Gmina Krokowa Krokowa Commune
- Gmina
- Coat of arms
- Interactive map of Gmina Krokowa
- Coordinates (Krokowa): 54°46′50″N 18°9′35″E
- Country: Poland
- Voivodeship: Pomeranian
- County: Puck
- Seat: Krokowa

Area
  - Total: 211.83 km^{2} (81.79 sq mi)

Population (2006)
  - Total: 10,089
  - Density: 47.628/km^{2} (123.36/sq mi)
- Website: http://www.krokowa.pl

Gmina Krokowa (Kashubian: Krokòwa) is a rural gmina (administrative district) in Puck County, Pomeranian Voivodeship, in northern Poland. Its seat is the village of Krokowa, which lies approximately 18 kilometres (11 mi) north-west of Puck and 56 km (35 mi) north-west of the regional capital Gdańsk.

The gmina covers an area of 211.83 square kilometres (81.8 sq mi), and as of 2006 its total population is 10,089.

The gmina contains part of the protected area called Coastal Landscape Park.

== Villages ==
Gmina Krokowa contains the villages and settlements of Białogóra, Brzyno, Dąbrowa, Dębki, Glinki, Górczyn, Goszczyno, Jeldzino, Karlikowo, Kartoszyno, Karwieńskie Błoto Drugie, Karwieńskie Błoto Pierwsze, Kłanino, Krokowa, Łętowice, Lisewo, Lubkowo, Lubocino, Minkowice, Odargowo, Odargowo-Kolonia, Parszczyce, Parszkowo, Piaśnica, Połchówko, Porąb, Prusewo, Sławoszynko, Sławoszyno, Słuchowo, Sobieńczyce, Sobieńczyce-Myśliwka, Sulicice, Świecino, Szary Dwór, Trzy Młyny, Tyłowo, Wierzchucino, Wybudowania Odargowskie, Żarnowiec and Zielony Dół.

== Neighbouring gminas ==
Gmina Krokowa is bordered by the town of Władysławowo and by the gminas of Choczewo, Gniewino, Puck and Wejherowo.
