= Wybudowania Odargowskie =

- Settlement
- Location within Poland
- Coordinates: 54°48′5″N 18°6′32″E
- Country: Poland
- Voivodeship: Pomeranian
- County: Puck
- Gmina: Krokowa

Wybudowania Odargowskie [vɨbudɔˈvaɲa ɔdarˈɡɔfskʲɛ] is a settlement in the administrative district of Gmina Krokowa, within Puck County, Pomeranian Voivodeship, in northern Poland.

For details of the history of the region, see History of Pomerania.
