= Brzyno =

- Village
- Location within Poland
- Coordinates: 54°46′23″N 18°0′42″E
- Country: Poland
- Voivodeship: Pomeranian
- County: Puck
- Gmina: Krokowa
- Population: 350
- Time zone: UTC+1 (CET)
  - Summer (DST): UTC+2 (CEST)

Brzyno ([ˈbʐɨnɔ]; Kashubian: Brzënie/Brzëno/Bżëno) is a village in the administrative district of Gmina Krokowa, within Puck County, Pomeranian Voivodeship, in northern Poland. It is located within the historic region of Pomerania.

During World War II the German administration operated a labor camp for prisoners of war from the Stalag II-B prisoner-of-war camp in the village.
