= Dębki =

- Village
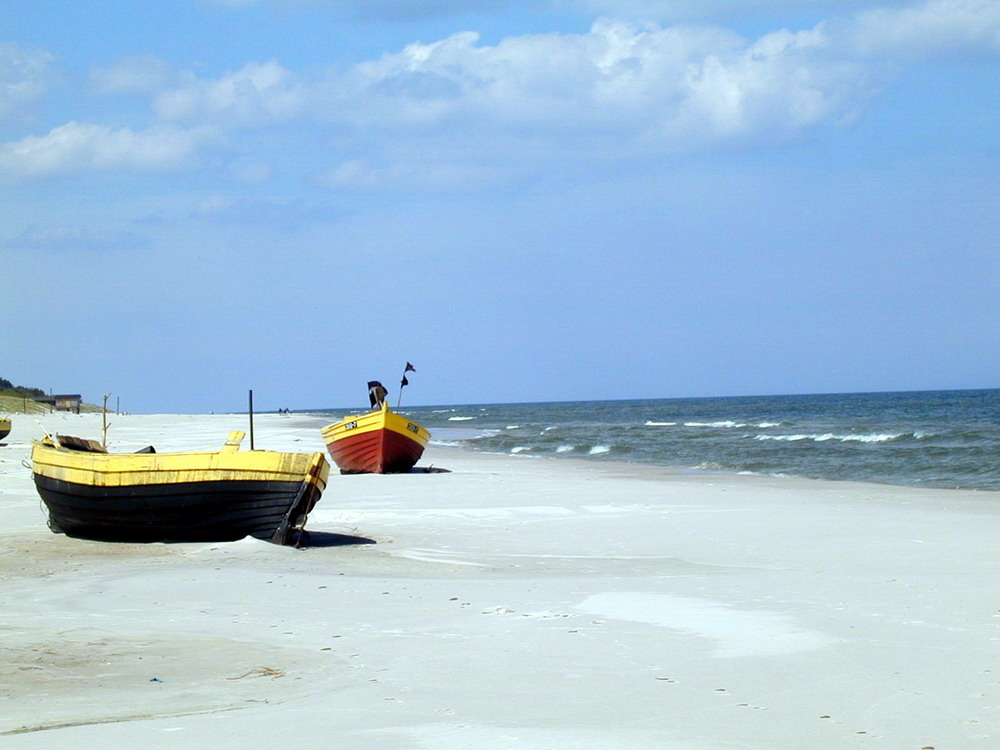
- Beach in Dębki

- Location within Poland
- Coordinates: 54°49′39″N 18°5′16″E
- Country: Poland
- Voivodeship: Pomeranian
- County: Puck
- Gmina: Krokowa
- Population: 166
- Website: http://www.debki.pl/

Dębki [ˈdɛmpki] is a village in the administrative district of Gmina Krokowa, within Puck County, Pomeranian Voivodeship, in northern Poland.

For details of the history of the region, see History of Pomerania.
