= Sobieńczyce =

- Village
- Location within Poland
- Coordinates: 54°44′51″N 18°7′48″E
- Country: Poland
- Voivodeship: Pomeranian
- County: Puck
- Gmina: Krokowa
- Population: 130

Sobieńczyce [sɔbjɛɲˈt͡ʂɨt͡sɛ] is a village in the administrative district of Gmina Krokowa, within Puck County, Pomeranian Voivodeship, in northern Poland.

For details of the history of the region, see History of Pomerania.
