= Minkowice, Pomeranian Voivodeship =

Minkowice
- Village
- Location within Poland
- Coordinates: 54°46′53″N 18°10′31″E
- Country: Poland
- Voivodeship: Pomeranian
- County: Puck
- Gmina: Krokowa
- Population: 425

Minkowice [minkɔˈvit͡sɛ] is a village in the administrative district of Gmina Krokowa, within Puck County, Pomeranian Voivodeship, in northern Poland.

For details of the history of the region, see History of Pomerania.
