= Lake Żarnowiec =

Lake in Wejherowo County, Pomeranian Voivodeship, Poland

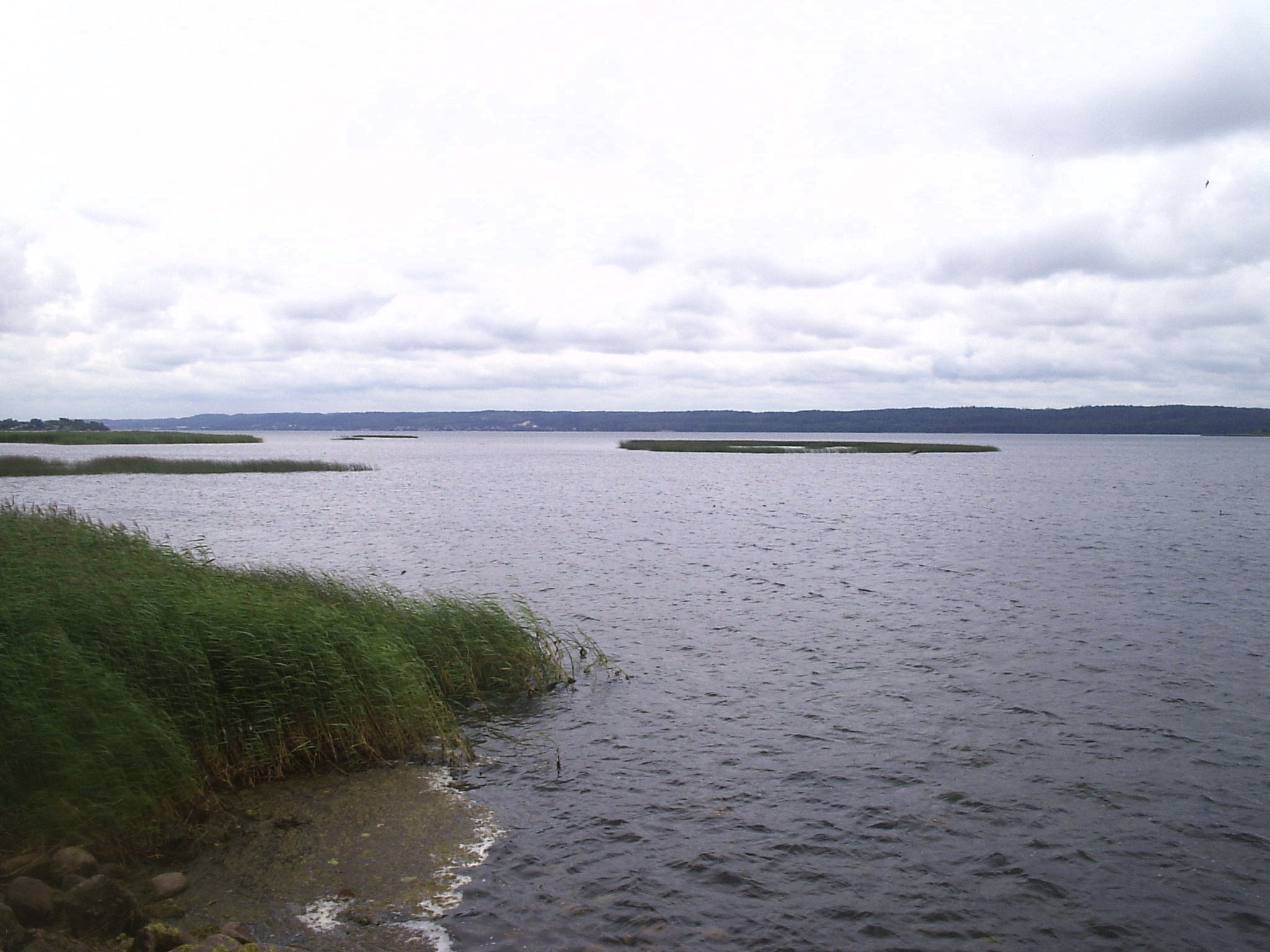

- Location within Poland Location within Pomeranian Voivodeship
- Location: Pomorze Voivodeship
- Coordinates: 54.763°N 18.053°E
- Primary inflows: Piaśnica
- Primary outflows: Piaśnica
- Basin countries: Poland
- Max. length: 7.6 km (4.7 mi)
- Max. width: 2.6 km (1.6 mi)
- Max. depth: 16 m (52 ft)

Lake Żarnowiec is located in the Pomorze Voivodeship. It is 7.6 km (4.7 mi) long, 2.6 km (1.6 mi) wide and has a depth of 16 m (52 ft). The river Piaśnica cuts through it. The Żarnowiec Nuclear Power Plant was supposed to be built next to it. It now serves as the lower reservoir for the Żarnowiec Pumped Storage Power Station.
