= Zielony Dół =

- Settlement
- Location within Poland
- Coordinates: 54°44′4″N 18°11′27″E
- Country: Poland
- Voivodeship: Pomeranian
- County: Puck
- Gmina: Krokowa
- Population: 203

Zielony Dół (Polish pronunciation: [ʑɛˈlɔnɨ ˈduw]) is a settlement in the administrative district of Gmina Krokowa, within Puck County, Pomeranian Voivodeship, in northern Poland.
