= Lubocino =

- Village
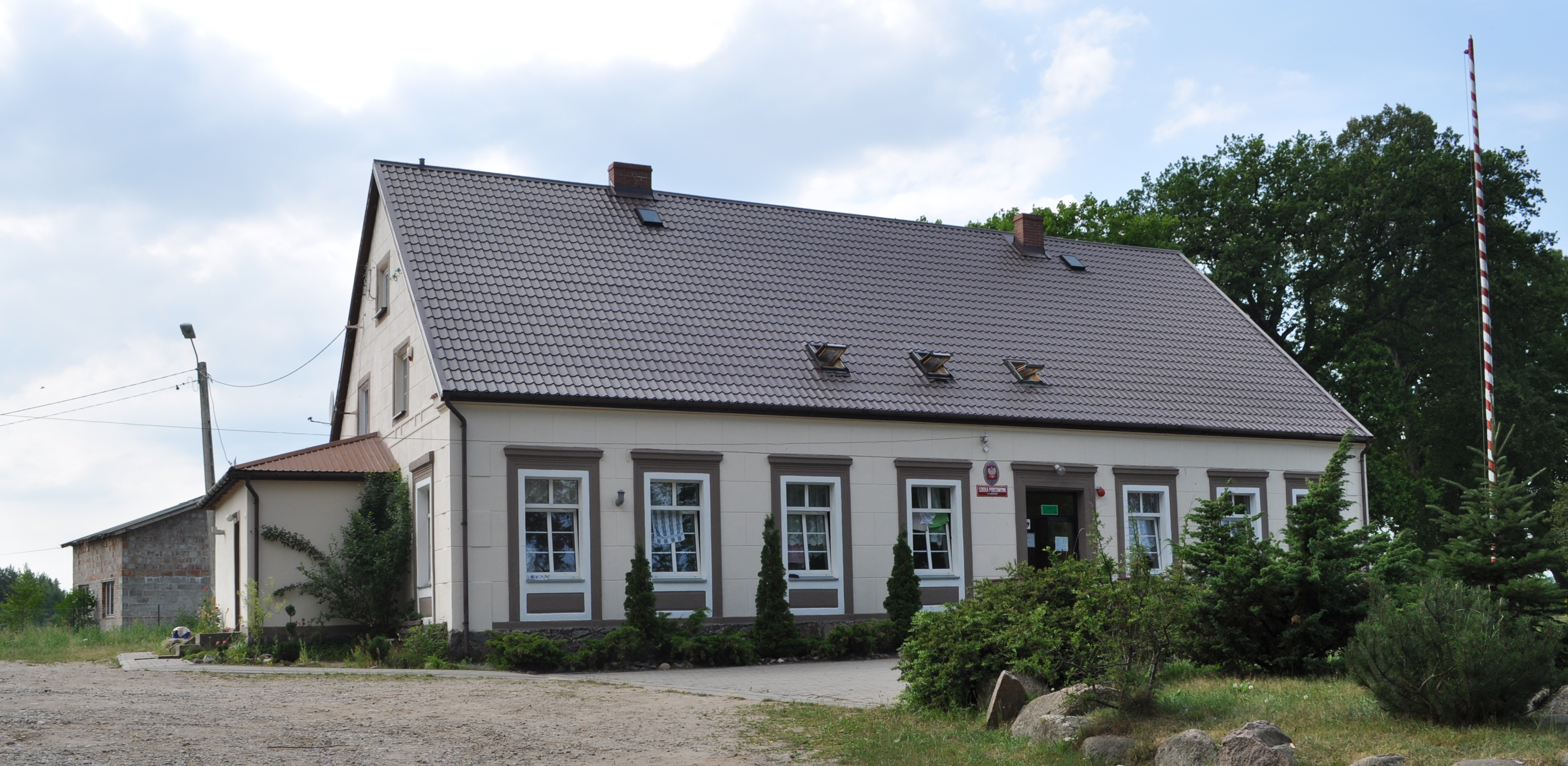
- School

- Location within Poland
- Coordinates: 54°43′36″N 18°8′31″E
- Country: Poland
- Voivodeship: Pomeranian
- County: Puck
- Gmina: Krokowa
- Population: 170

Lubocino [lubɔˈt͡ɕinɔ] is a village in the administrative district of Gmina Krokowa, within Puck County, Pomeranian Voivodeship, in northern Poland.

For details of the history of the region, see History of Pomerania.
