= Trzy Młyny =

- Settlement
- Location within Poland
- Coordinates: 54°45′7″N 18°10′55″E
- Country: Poland
- Voivodeship: Pomeranian
- County: Puck
- Gmina: Krokowa

Trzy Młyny [ˈtʐɨ ˈmwɨnɨ] is a settlement in the administrative district of Gmina Krokowa, within Puck County, Pomeranian Voivodeship, in northern Poland.

For details of the history of the region, see History of Pomerania.
