= Piaśnica, Puck County =

Piaśnica
- Settlement
- Location within Poland
- Coordinates: 54°49′54″N 18°3′16″E
- Country: Poland
- Voivodeship: Pomeranian
- County: Puck
- Gmina: Krokowa
- Population: 0

Piaśnica [pjaɕˈnit͡sa] is a former settlement in the administrative district of Gmina Krokowa, within Puck County, Pomeranian Voivodeship, in northern Poland.

For details of the history of the region, see History of Pomerania.
