= Białogóra =

- Village
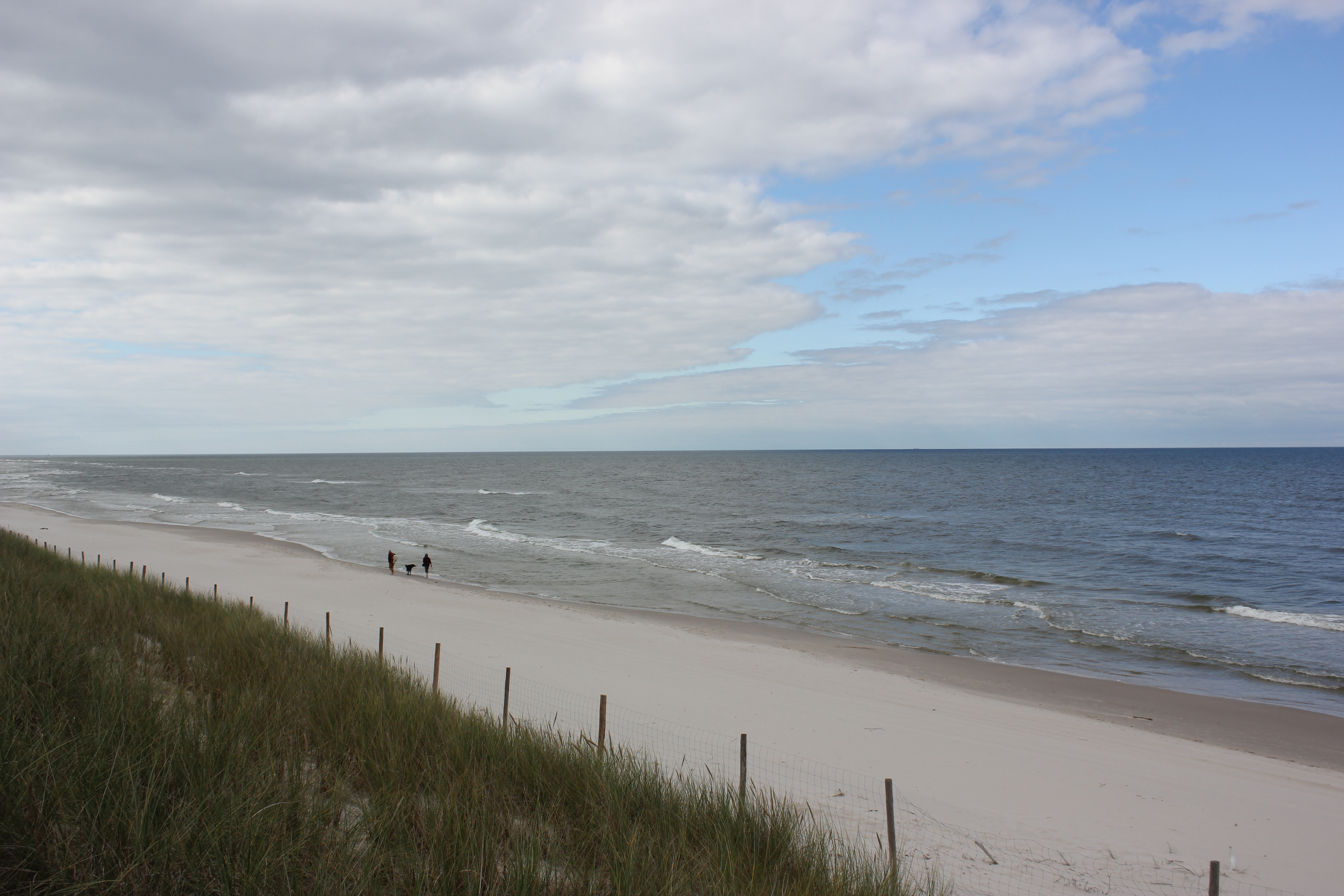
- Beach in Białogóra

- Location within Poland
- Coordinates: 54°48′56″N 17°57′24″E
- Country: Poland
- Voivodeship: Pomeranian
- County: Puck
- Gmina: Krokowa
- Population: 359
- Time zone: UTC+1 (CET)
  - Summer (DST): UTC+2 (CEST)
- Vehicle registration: GPU

Białogóra [bjawɔˈɡura] (Kashubian: Biôło Gòra/Biôłô Góra, German: Wittenberg) is a village in the administrative district of Gmina Krokowa, within Puck County, Pomeranian Voivodeship, in northern Poland. It is located on the Slovincian Coast in the historic region of Pomerania.
