= Zdrada, Pomeranian Voivodeship =

Zdrada
- Village
- Location within Poland
- Coordinates: 54°43′16″N 18°19′4″E
- Country: Poland
- Voivodeship: Pomeranian
- County: Puck
- Gmina: Puck
- Population: 120

Zdrada ([ˈzdrada]; German: 1942–45 Mechenhof) is a village in the administrative district of Gmina Puck, within Puck County, Pomeranian Voivodeship, in northern Poland.

For details of the history of the region, see History of Pomerania.
