= Piotr Dunin =

Piotr Dunin (c. 1415 – 1484) was a Polish knight, leader. He was Starost of Malbork from 1478–1484, castellan of Sieradz from 1478, and voivode of Brześć Kujawski Voivodeship from 1481.

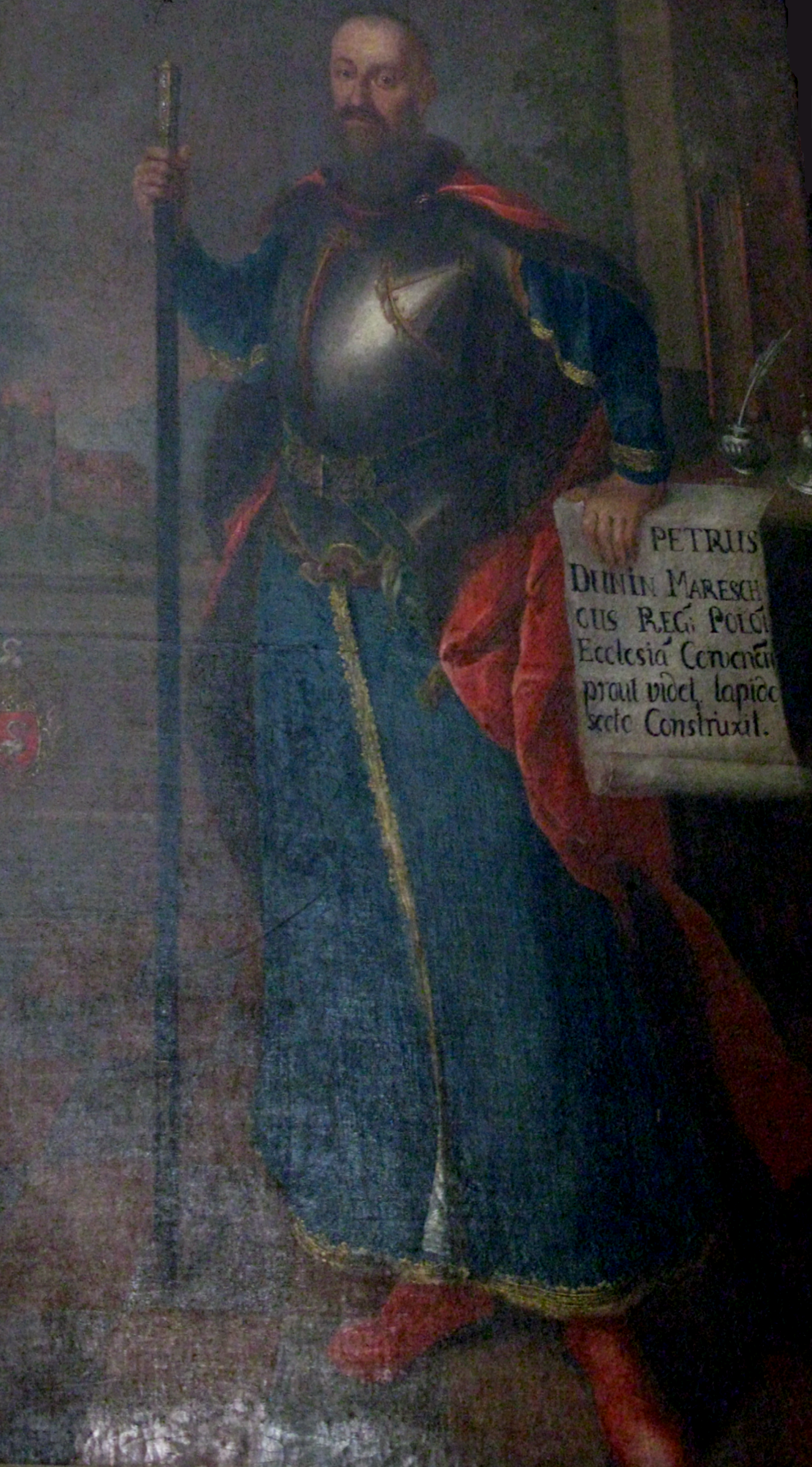
Anonymous eighteenth century painting of Piotr Dunin

== Early life ==
Born into an old Dunin family, as the son of Włodzimierz (Warsz) Dunin (d. 1414) and his wife, Anna Dunin.

== Career ==
On 17 September 1462 he led the Polish army to victory over the Teutonic Knights in the Battle of Świecino. This Thirteen Years' War battle brought an end to Teutonic control of the region, as the Knights never recovered from it and those that followed.
