= Połchówko =

- Village
- Location within Poland
- Coordinates: 54°44′35″N 18°12′48″E
- Country: Poland
- Voivodeship: Pomeranian
- County: Puck
- Gmina: Krokowa
- Population: 151

Połchówko [pɔu̯ˈxufkɔ] is a village in the administrative district of Gmina Krokowa, within Puck County, Pomeranian Voivodeship, in northern Poland. To the south of the village there are erratic boulders Boża Stopka, Biały Kamień, and Diabelski Kamień.

For details of the history of the region, see History of Pomerania.
