= Kartoszyno =

- Village
- Location within Poland
- Coordinates: 54°44′17″N 18°5′49″E
- Country: Poland
- Voivodeship: Pomeranian
- County: Puck
- Gmina: Krokowa

Kartoszyno [kartɔˈʂɨnɔ] is a village in the administrative district of Gmina Krokowa, within Puck County, Pomeranian Voivodeship, in northern Poland.

== History ==
Kartoszyno is a former village, the area of which is one of the oldest settlements in Pomerania. On the Castle Hill, at the foot of which the village is located, the remains of a stronghold from the early Middle Ages (8th-9th centuries) were discovered. The first mentions of Kartoszyno date back to 1284. In historical documents, the village appears under the names: Kartoszyn (German: Kartoschin), Karthusin, etc. Initially, the village belonged to the Cistercian order, then to the Benedictine order. In the interwar period, the Polish-German border ran through its vicinity.

In nearby Nadole, there is an open-air museum, where a 19th-century peasant farmstead from Kartoszyn has been reconstructed.

Since 1982, Kartoszyno has been the site of the construction of the Żarnowiec Nuclear Power Plant. This investment was abandoned in 1990. Some of the then relocated residents were given houses in nearby Odargowo. The fate of families who were forced to leave their homes due to the construction of the power plant was the subject of a documentary film entitled “Ojcowizna” directed by Ireneusz Engler.

The construction zone of the “Żarnowiec Power Plant” gained an electrified railway connection with Wejherowo (in the 1980s, this line was to be part of an electrified connection to the Nuclear Power Plant in Żarnowiec – a prospective extension of the Tri-City SKM network). In recent years, the traction network was completely dismantled and the line itself suspended.

== Present day ==
In 1993, the Żarnowiec Economic Zone was established in the area where the power plant was to be built. The aim was to develop the area and make the existing infrastructure available for industrial activity. In 1997, as a result of the merger, the zone adopted the name of the Special Economic Zone Żarnowiec-Tczew. Currently, after subsequent transformations, it is the Pomeranian Special Economic Zone - Żarnowiec Area.

The land and buildings in the Zone, sold to manufacturing and service companies, are already mostly developed. Currently, Kartoszyn is home to several dozen companies operating in various industries - including construction, chemicals, plastics, metal products, IT, fish processing and others. The construction of the Żarnowiec Gas Power Plant was also planned.

The following streets lie in Kartoszyn: Budowlana, Leśna, Okrężna, Prosta, Przemysłowa, Spokojna, Stolarska, Torfowa, Widokowa and Żarnowiecka.
