= Świecino =

- Village
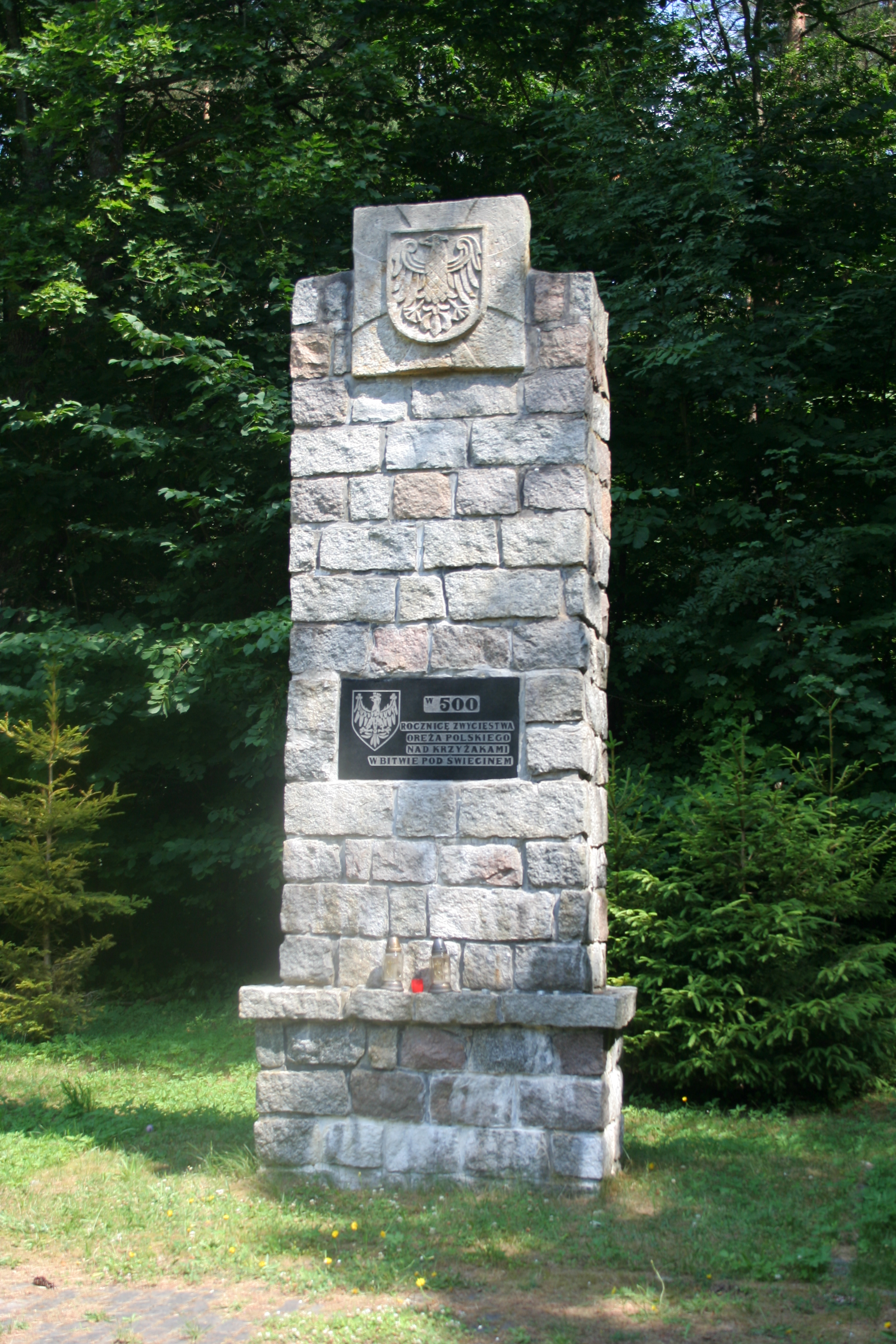
- Battle of Świecino monument

- Location within Poland
- Coordinates: 54°44′10″N 18°10′27″E
- Country: Poland
- Voivodeship: Pomeranian
- County: Puck
- Gmina: Krokowa

Population
  - Total: 203
- Time zone: UTC+1 (CET)
  - Summer (DST): UTC+2 (CEST)
- Postal code: 84-110
- Vehicle registration: GPU

Świecino (Polish: [ɕfjɛˈt͡ɕinɔ]) is a village in the administrative district of Gmina Krokowa, within Puck County, Pomeranian Voivodeship, in northern Poland.

Świecino is famous for the Battle of Świecino of 1462, in which Polish forces defeated the Teutonic Knights. An event reconstructing the battle proceedings was last held on the village grounds on 2 August 2025. The event is annual and runs for a couple of years.
