= Górczyn, Puck County =

Górczyn
- Settlement
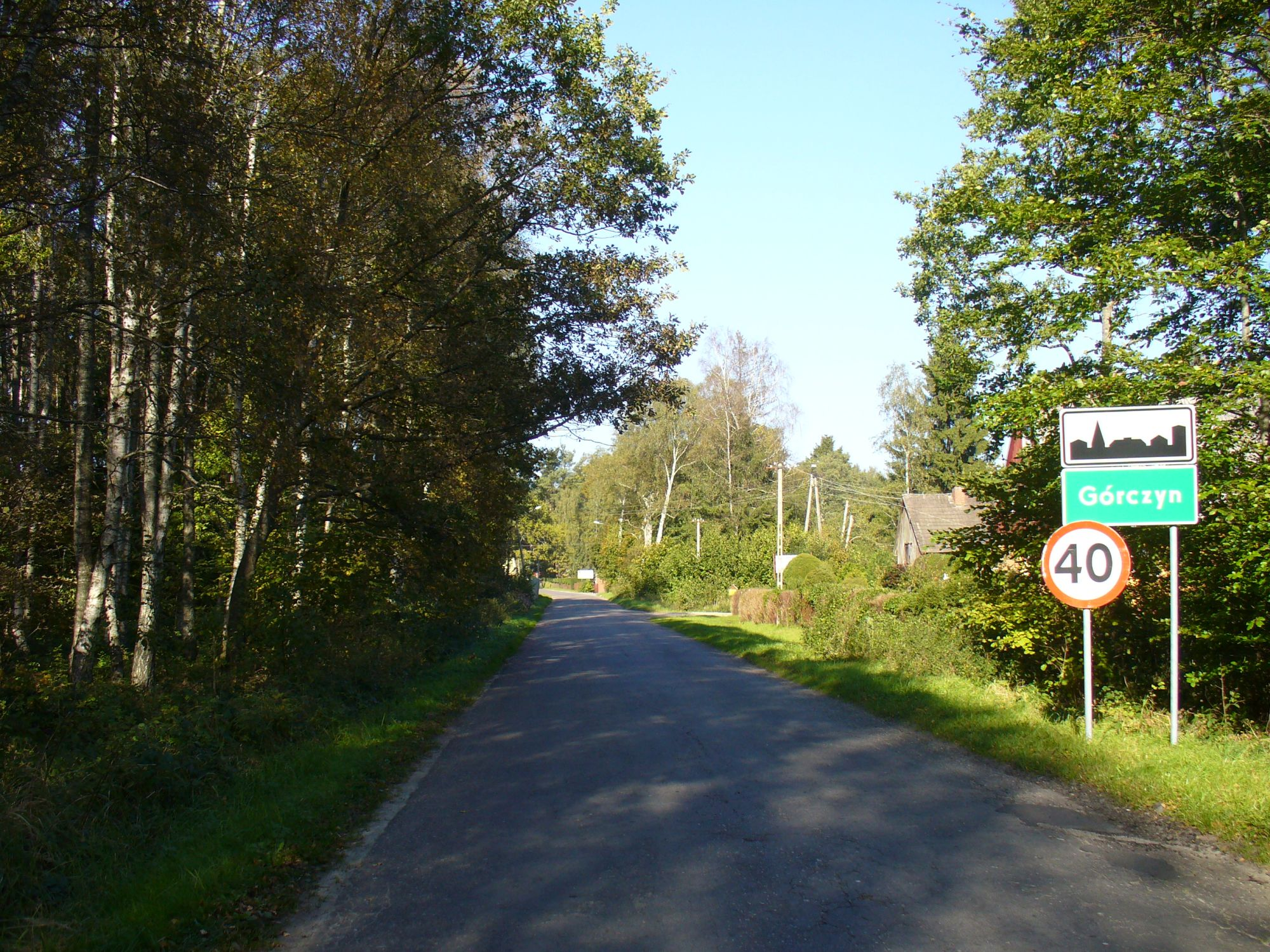

- Location within Poland
- Coordinates: 54°48′18″N 17°57′46″E
- Country: Poland
- Voivodeship: Pomeranian
- County: Puck
- Gmina: Krokowa

Górczyn [ˈɡurt͡ʂɨn] is a settlement in the administrative district of Gmina Krokowa, within Puck County, Pomeranian Voivodeship, in northern Poland.

For details of the history of the region, see History of Pomerania.
