= Żarnowiec Pumped Storage Power Station =

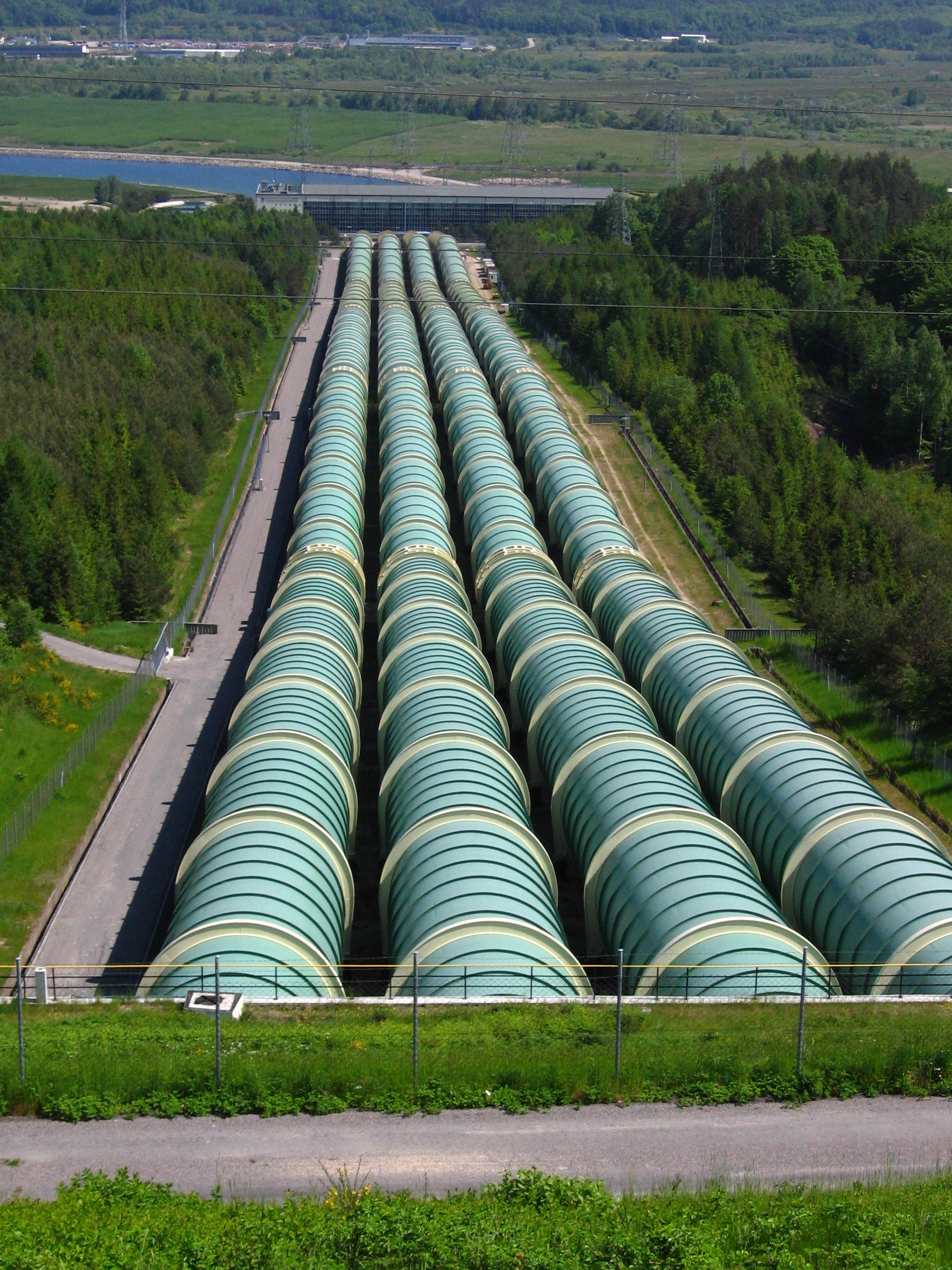
- Penstocks connecting the upper and lower reservoirs
- Interactive map of Żarnowiec Pumped Storage Power Station
- Country: Poland
- Location: Czymanowo
- Coordinates: 54°43′20.18″N 18°04′56.48″E
- Status: Operational
- Construction began: 1973
- Opening date: 1983
- Owner: PGE Polska Grupa Energetyczna

Upper reservoir
- Creates: Upper Żarnowiec
- Total capacity: 16,445,000 m^{3} (13,332 acre⋅ft)

Lower reservoir
- Creates: Lake Żarnowiec
- Total capacity: 124,000,000 m^{3} (101,000 acre⋅ft)

Power Station
- Hydraulic head: 119.3 m (391 ft)
- Turbines: 4 x 170 MW reversible Francis turbines
- Installed capacity: 680 MW

The Żarnowiec Pumped Storage Power Station is a pumped-storage power station located about 7 km (4.3 mi) south of Żarnowiec, in Puck County, northern Poland. It was constructed between 1973 and 1983 and underwent a modernisation between 2007 and 2011, with the upper reservoir reconstructed in 2006.

With a capacity of 680 MW, it is the largest hydroelectric power station in Poland. It uses four 170 MW Francis pump-turbines to send water from its lower reservoir, Lake Żarnowiec, up to an upper reservoir for storage. During periods of high power demand, the water is released back down to the turbines to produce power. Water is pumped back up during periods of low power demand, such as night time. The power station was originally intended to be a load balancer for Żarnowiec Nuclear Power Plant which was supposed to be constructed on the opposite side of Lake Żarnowiec. A 900 MWh / 263 MW grid battery is scheduled for 2029.

== See also ==
- Renewable energy in Poland
