= Odargowo, Pomeranian Voivodeship =

Odargowo
- Village
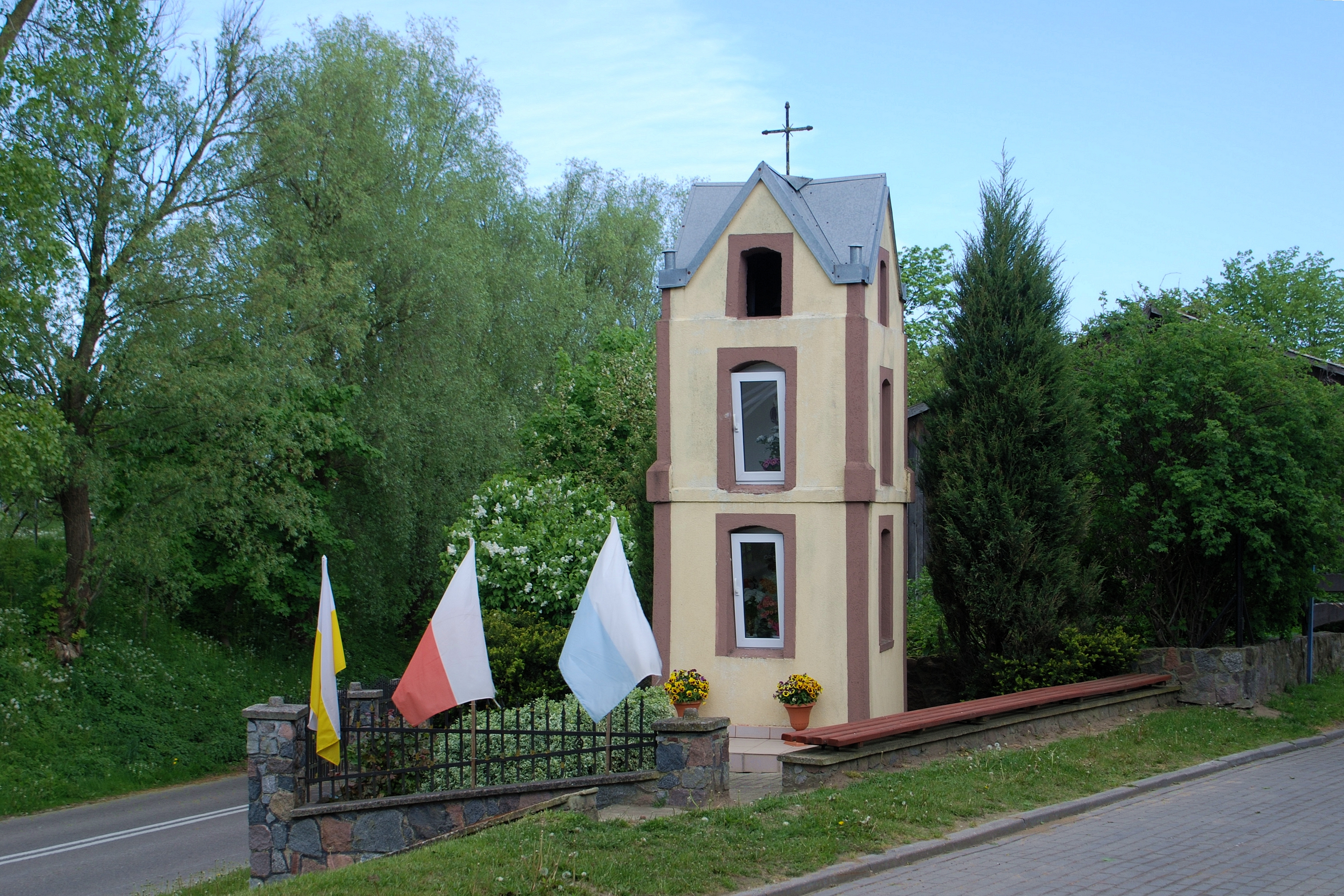
- Odargowo chapel

- Location within Poland
- Coordinates: 54°47′36″N 18°7′0″E
- Country: Poland
- Voivodeship: Pomeranian
- County: Puck
- Gmina: Krokowa
- Population: 323

Odargowo ([ɔdarˈɡɔvɔ]; Kashubian: Òdargòwò; German: Odargau) is a village in the administrative district of Gmina Krokowa, within Puck County, Pomeranian Voivodeship, in northern Poland.

For details of the history of the region, see History of Pomerania.
