= Prusewo =

- Village
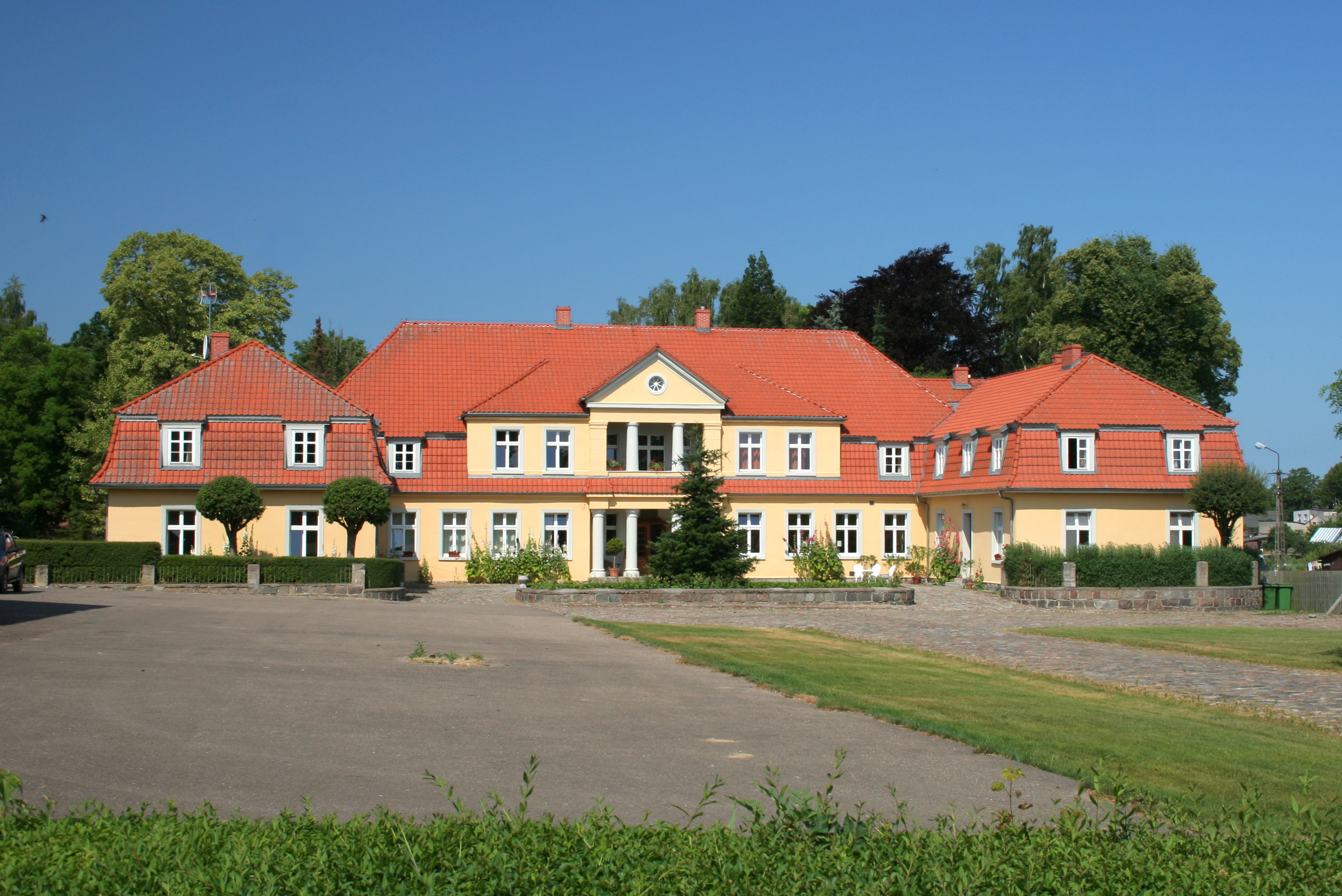
- Szęść Dębów ("Six Oaks") Manor House in Prusewo

- Location within Poland
- Coordinates: 54°46′23″N 17°59′1″E
- Country: Poland
- Voivodeship: Pomeranian
- County: Puck
- Gmina: Krokowa
- Population: 305
- Time zone: UTC+1 (CET)
  - Summer (DST): UTC+2 (CEST)
- Vehicle registration: GPU

Prusewo [pruˈsɛvɔ] (German: Prüssau) is a village in the administrative district of Gmina Krokowa, within Puck County, Pomeranian Voivodeship, in northern Poland. It is located within the ethnocultural region of Kashubia in the historic region of Pomerania.

Prusewo was a royal village of the Polish Crown, administratively located in the Puck County in the Pomeranian Voivodeship.

During World War II the German Nazi administration operated a labor camp for prisoners of war from the Stalag II-B prisoner-of-war camp in the village.
