= Żarnowiec Nuclear Power Plant =

Unfinished nuclear power station in Poland

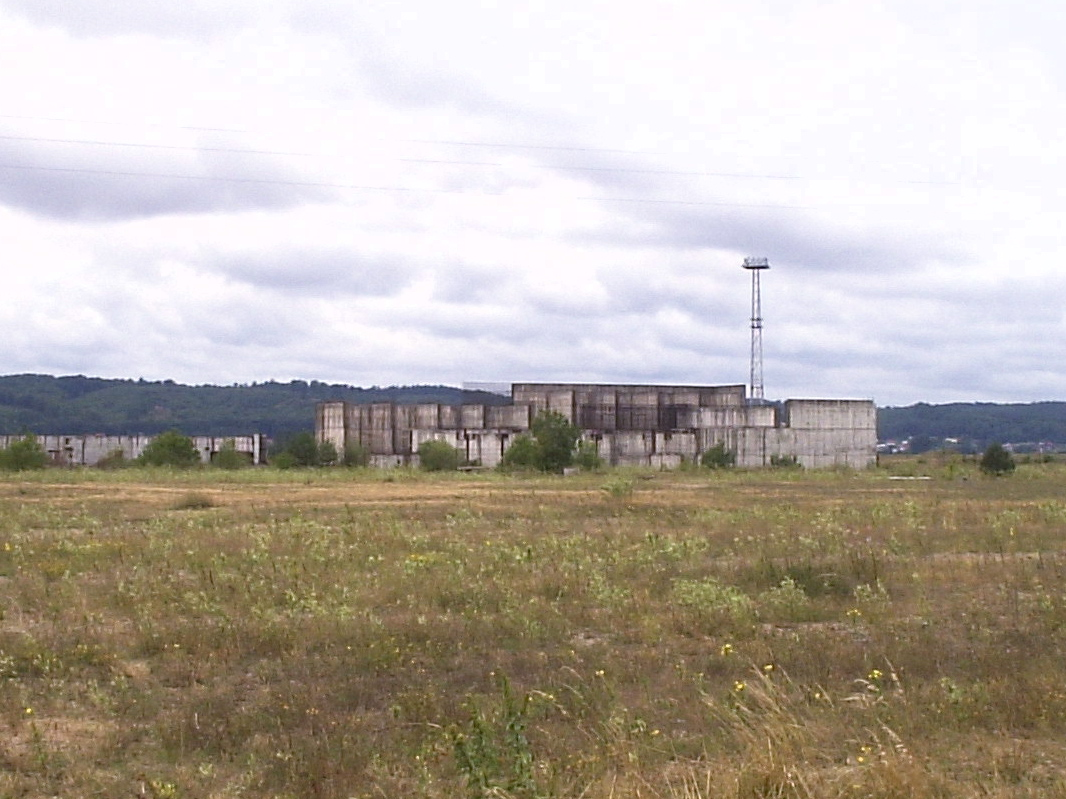
- Unfinished remains of Żarnowiec Nuclear Power Plant
- Country: Poland
- Location: Żarnowiec
- Coordinates: 54°44′35.64″N 18°05′20.05″E
- Status: Cancelled
- Construction began: March 31, 1982

Power generation
- Units cancelled: 4 × 440 MW
- Nameplate capacity: 1,600 MW; 1,860 MW

External links
- Commons: Related media on Commons
- The construction was ultimately cancelled on September 4, 1990

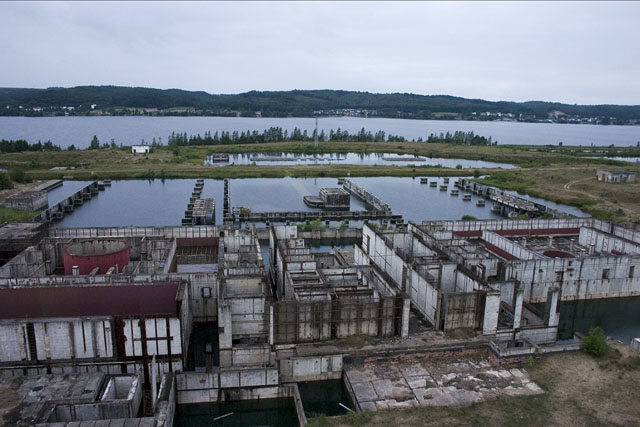
Unfinished remains of main building of Żarnowiec Nuclear Power Plant

The Żarnowiec Nuclear Power Plant (Polish: Elektrownia Jądrowa Żarnowiec) was to be the first nuclear power plant in Poland. The construction was cancelled due to changes in the economic and political situation in Poland, in the Soviet Union and in the Eastern Bloc and due to the Chernobyl disaster in 1986 and the following years. It was to be located in the former village of Kartoszyno and had its seat in Nadole.

== Planned design ==
The location of the plant was chosen after several years of hydrological, seismological and demographic research commissioned for the purpose of determining the most suitable location. A site was located in the north of the country near the Baltic Sea, about 50 km northwest of Gdańsk, just to the south of its namesake village Żarnowiec, adjacent to Lake Żarnowiec which was to be used for cooling. The research also identified the site for a second plant in Klempicz in west-central Poland.

The plant was planned to occupy 70 ha of land area, while the entire complex with dedicated construction facilities and supporting buildings would take 425 ha. The design incorporated four VVER-440 pressurized water reactors of Soviet design produced in Škoda factories in Czechoslovakia, rated at 440 MWe each, for a combined power rating of 1600 MWe. The turbines and power generators were to be produced in Poland. An adjacent pumped-storage plant was to act as a load balancer and energy reservoir to ensure continued power delivery during reactor maintenance.

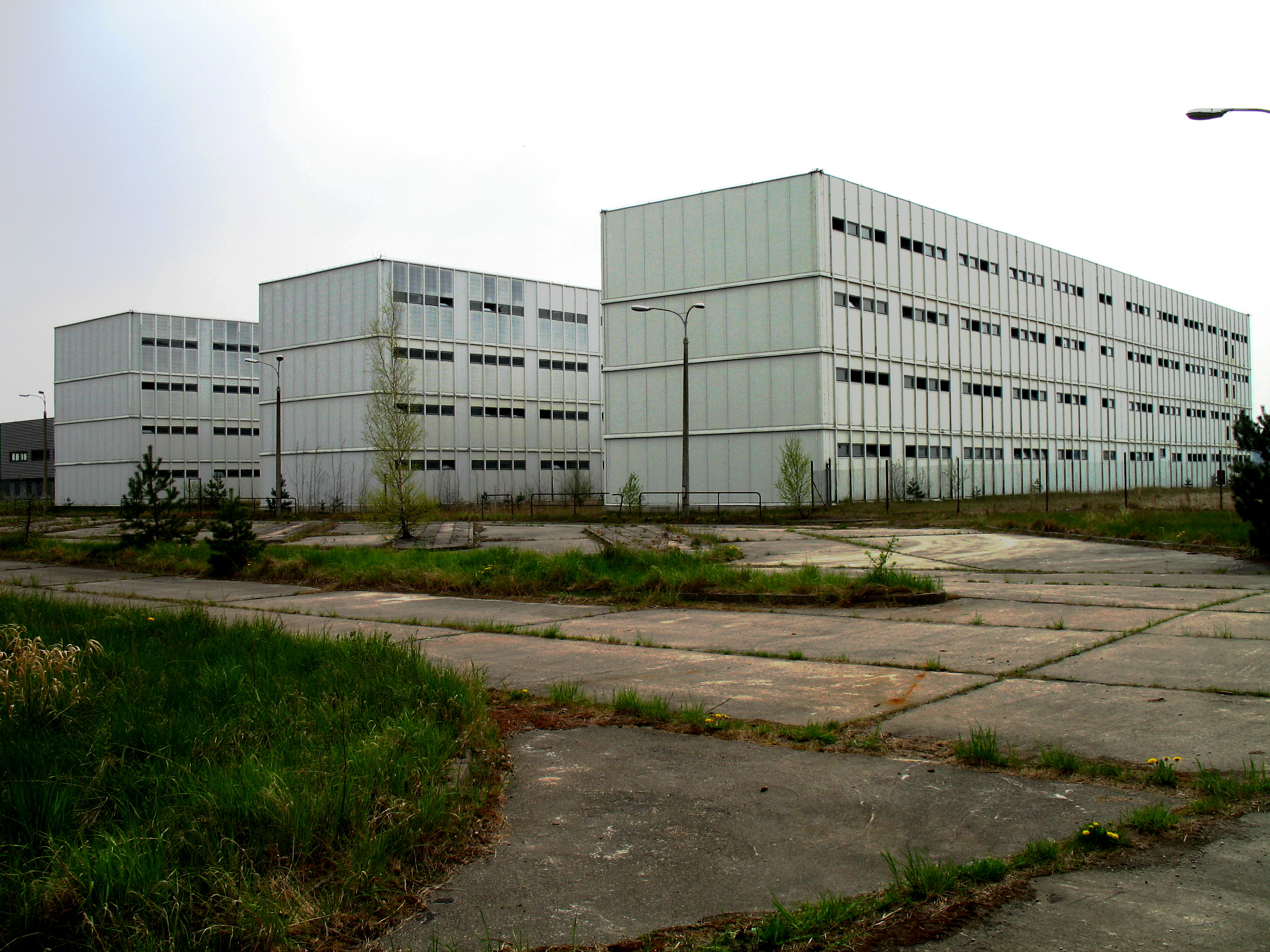
Cloakroom halls

Completion of the first reactor block with a power rating of 465 MWe was planned for 1989, with the second one following in 1990. On the last day of 1983 the dates were adjusted to December 1990 and December 1991, respectively. After the Chernobyl disaster in 1986, there were plans to make modifications in order to bring the plant to Western safety standards, as well as install reactor automation equipment from Siemens AG.

In addition to 79 buildings of the reactor-housing compound, the complex included a lot of supporting facilities. Before the project was canceled, 630 other structures were completed, including a modern radiometeorology station, housing for the staff, production halls for prefabricated concrete elements, a railroad station, a cafeteria and cloakroom halls. Several domestic and foreign companies were involved in the project.

== Timeline ==
- December 9, 1972 – The Planning Commission approves the localization of the first Polish nuclear plant in the village of Kartoszyno. Shortly thereafter a research outpost is constructed on the site
- January 18, 1982 – The Council of Ministers passes a decree regarding the construction of the Żarnowiec Nuclear Power Plant
- March 31, 1982 – The construction site is transferred to the main contractor, Energoblok-Wybrzeże; Start of construction work and relocation of the inhabitants of Kartoszyno
- December 31, 1983 – The Council of Ministers adjusts the planned dates of completion to December 1990 for block 1 and December 1991 for block 2
- April 10, 1986 – Sejm passes the first bill (called Nuclear law) regulating the use of nuclear energy in Poland
- April 26, 1986 – Chernobyl disaster. Escalation of protests against the construction
- December 2, 1989 – The cabinet led by Tadeusz Mazowiecki decides to halt construction work for one year in order to collect opinions and information necessary to decide the fate of the power plant
- May 27, 1990 – Referendum in the Gdańsk voivodeship. 86.1% of voters are against continuing the construction, with a turnout of 44.3%
- December 17, 1990 – The Council of Ministers initiates the liquidation of the unfinished power plant, set to complete on December 31, 1992

== Meteorological Centre ==
Near the construction site, there was also a centre for meteorological research with a 205 metres high guyed meteorological tower at 54°43′55″N 18°05′35″E. While the buildings of the station still exist, but are devastated, the mast is demolished.

== Public opposition ==
There was some official public discussion concerning the localization of the power plant, but it was interrupted by the introduction of martial law in Poland in 1981. Despite this, no organized opposition beyond sending letters to the authorities took place.

The protests escalated only after the Chernobyl disaster in 1986. Ecological organizations were the most active participants. The most prominent local organizations were the Franciscan Ecological Movement, which organized a series of public lectures on the risks of the Żarnowiec power plant, miniconferences in the Gdańsk Scientific Society, and manifestations; and the Gdańsk Economic Forum, an anti-nuclear organization which initiated manifestations at the construction site, conducted leaflet campaigns in the Tricity and sent hundreds of letters to the authorities. Some nationwide organizations such as Ruch Wolność i Pokój joined the protest and were responsible for its most drastic forms, including roadblocks and a 63-day hunger strike. Several public figures spoke against completing the project, including the leader of Solidarity, Lech Wałęsa. Protesters also cited the negative assessment of the plant's security by two employees of the National Atomic Energy Agency.

The protests forced the government to hold a local referendum concerning the plant. An initial decision was taken in 1987, but was postponed for political reasons until the local government elections in 1990. The referendum was preceded by an intensive propaganda action by Gdańsk's ecological organizations. Among the information in the disseminated leaflets and posters, there were false claims of the reactors being of the same design as those in Chernobyl, "deep tectonic movements" which would cause the failure of the pumped-storage reservoir and flooding, and supposed inevitable radioactive contamination of the lake due to an open-ended cooling system. The results were strongly negative, with 86.1% of voters against completing the power plant.

The results were not legally binding, since the turnout was below the threshold, and the construction continued for some time. This caused a second, even more intense wave of opposition, this time predominantly from nearby residents. Using tractors and agricultural equipment for roadblocks, they managed to significantly decrease the pace of work.

== Abandonment ==
The project was finally canceled by the Council of Ministers on September 4, 1990, after the recommendation of the Minister of Industry, Tadeusz Syryjczyk. He claimed the plant would be redundant in the Polish energy grid, had questionable economy of operation and was of unclear safety. The decision was motivated predominantly by the public outcry and the need to increase political support for the newly formed government, even though the supplied official reasons did not cite them as an important factor. At that time, the supporting infrastructure was almost complete, and the first reactor block was about 40% complete. 44% of the planned budget was already spent, but further expenses unavoidable even if the construction was halted increased the total expenditure to about 84% of the budget.

== Aftermath ==
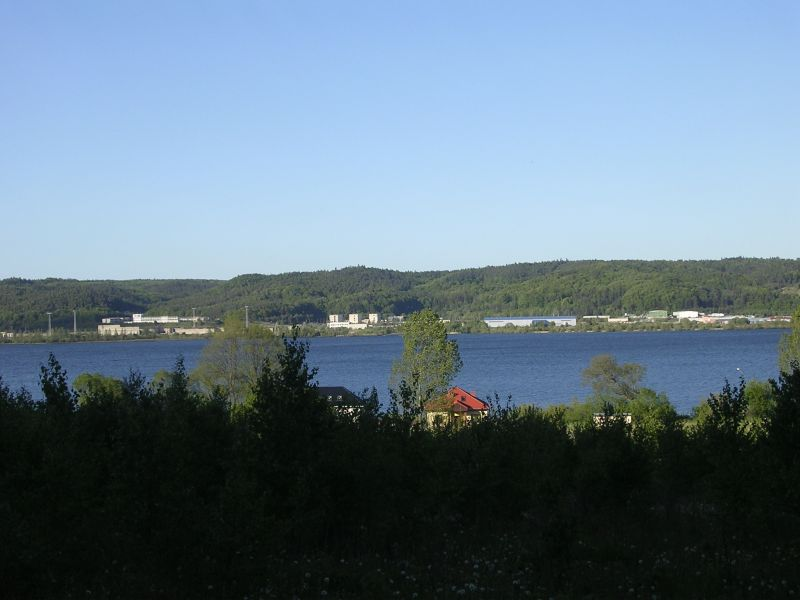
Buildings of the former power plant (now the Pomeranian Special Economic Zone) as seen from Nadole

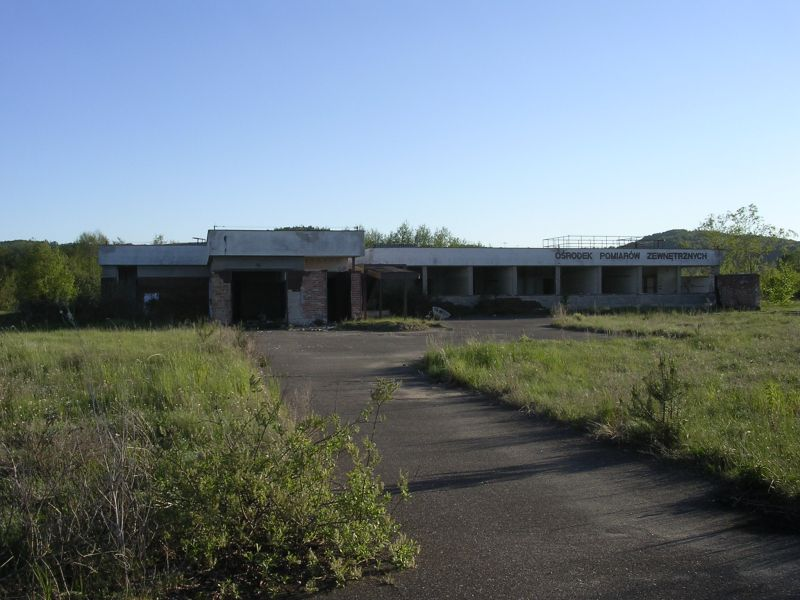
Devastated meteorological station

After the construction was halted, a large amount of specialized equipment was immediately rendered useless. Most of it, including two of the four reactor vessels, were scrapped. The third reactor vessel, along with various other equipment, was bought by a nuclear plant in Loviisa in Finland for training purposes. The fourth is located in a training facility for nuclear industry workers in Paks, Hungary. The total amount of money recovered was about $6 million, compared to the estimated expenditures of more than $500 million.

The local government which took over the buildings was unsuccessful in preventing the already constructed buildings from falling into disrepair. Several of them were looted and devastated. No action was taken to preserve the reactor building; it was flooded with water and is unsuitable for resuming construction. In an attempt to utilize the industrial equipment left behind, in 1993 the Żarnowiec Economic Zone was created, later incorporated into the Pomeranian Special Economic Zone. Among the first businesses started in the zone were a printing house, an agricultural chemicals plant, a pipe factory and a chips factory. However, the initiative had only limited success because of transport issues. The electrified railway line built for the power plant was completely dismantled. This contributed to a lack of interest from prospective investors, and several developments (including a gas power station) were canceled. Currently there are about 20 companies operating in the resettled town of Kartoszyno. Sources close to the proponents of the power plant claim that the losses resulting from mismanagement of the abandoned property could be as high as $2 billion.

== Consequences ==
=== Environmental impact ===
The abandonment of the plant meant a large increase in emissions of carbon dioxide and other pollutants, since electricity in Poland mainly comes from coal.

Because the power plant was to incorporate an open-ended cooling system that returned hot water from cooling directly to the Żarnowiec Lake, the average temperature of the lake was predicted to rise by about 10 °C, so that even during winter the surface would not freeze. To prevent the uncontrolled growth of flora in such conditions, an ecological engineering project was started to introduce warm-water herbivore fish species, such as grass carps. As the first phase, to reduce the population of carnivorous species, fishing limits for them were lifted. The regulations were not changed after the construction was abandoned, causing an almost complete depletion of the lake's fishstock.

The pumped-storage reservoir now operates as the Żarnowiec Pumped Storage Power Station, the largest pumped-storage plant in Poland. Its operation causes variations in the lake's water level, causing the erosion of soil on its shores.

=== Legacy ===
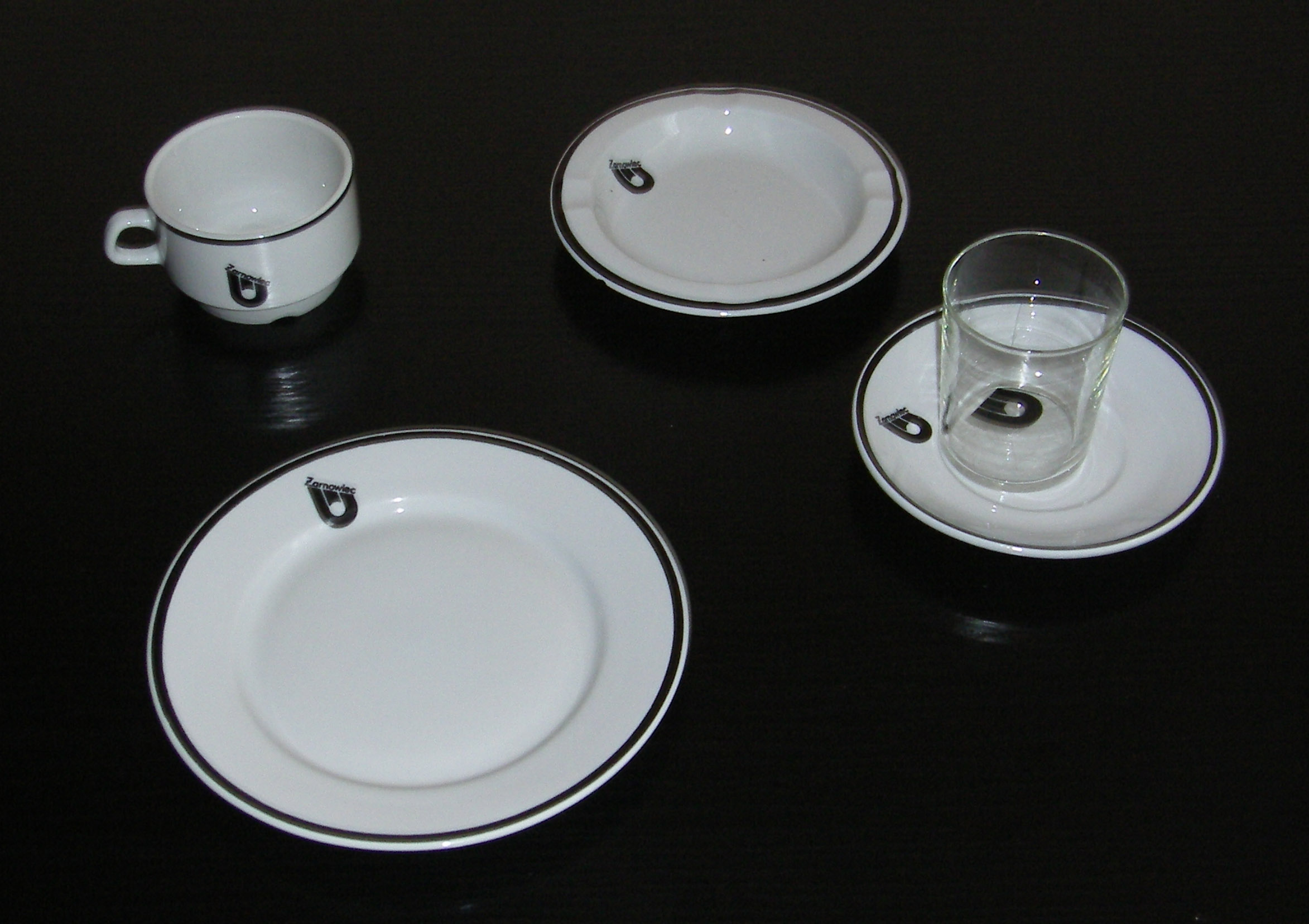
Tableware with the power plant's logo

One of the traces of the Żarnowiec Nuclear Power Plant is a special set of tableware emblazoned with the power plant's logo.

The meteorogical station operated until its parent company went bankrupt in 2002. Its equipment included a Plessey WP3 meteo radar, which was destroyed by scrap metal looters.

After a 2004 earthquake in Kaliningrad, the seismic stability of northern Poland was put in question.

=== Nuclear energy in Poland after Żarnowiec ===
At present, the future of nuclear energy in Poland is still an open issue. With growing demand for electricity, the traditional power plants burning coal are generating more and more environmental problems. In 2005, preliminary plans for constructing a nuclear power plant near the special economic zone surfaced. On July 1, 2005, the Ministry of Economy and Labor issued a statement titled Energy policy for Poland until 2025, which included mentions of the need for better public information about nuclear energy associated with 'the possibility of introducing such means of energy generation in Poland'. In 2008, a program called Polish energy policy until 2030 was approved, which outlines plans for two nuclear power plants to be built by 2020. The National Nuclear Energy Agency identified the formerly planned sites at Żarnowiec and Klempicz and 6 alternative locations as the possible choices, along with 5 locations for nuclear waste storage. The Żarnowiec site has the advantage that most of the studies necessary before constructing a power plant have already been done.

A 2006 poll for the National Atomic Energy Agency found out that 60% accepted the construction of nuclear power plants to reduce the dependency on foreign gas, while 48% were in favor of constructing it near their place of residence if it reduced energy costs. A 2008 poll indicates that over 70% of Poles approved the construction of a nuclear power plant within 100 kilometers of their place of residence, 18% were against, while at the same time 47% stated that Poland should not invest in nuclear energy.

The popular Baltic Sea resort Mielno is one of three sites selected by Polish power company PGE in November 2011 to host a nuclear power station with a capacity of 3 gigawatts. In February 2012, residents voted overwhelmingly against the plan. Some 94 percent of the 2,389 people who took part in a referendum opposed the plant and only 5 percent supported it.

== See also ==
- Żarnowiec Pumped Storage Power Station – a pumped-storage plant originally intended only as an energy reservoir and load balancer
- List of commercial nuclear reactors#Poland
