= Roszczyce railway station =

Railway station in Poland

Roszczyce

General information
- Location: Roszczyce; Poland
- Owner: Polskie Koleje Państwowe S.A.
- Platforms: None

Construction
- Structure type: Building: No; Depot: No; Water tower: No
Location

Roszczyce is a non-operational PKP railway station in Roszczyce (Pomeranian Voivodeship), Poland.

== Lines crossing the station ==
Start station	End station	Line type
Wrzeście	Bargędzino	Dismantled
