= Komoszewo railway station =

Railway station in Poland

Komoszewo

General information
- Location: Komoszewo; Poland
- Owner: Polskie Koleje Państwowe S.A.
- Platforms: None

Construction
- Structure type: Building: No; Depot: No; Water tower: No
Location

Komoszewo is a non-operational PKP railway station in Komoszewo (Pomeranian Voivodeship), Poland.

== Lines crossing the station ==
Start station	End station	Line type
Wrzeście	Bargędzino	Dismantled
