= Cyclone Xaver =

Winter storm that affected northern Europe in 2013

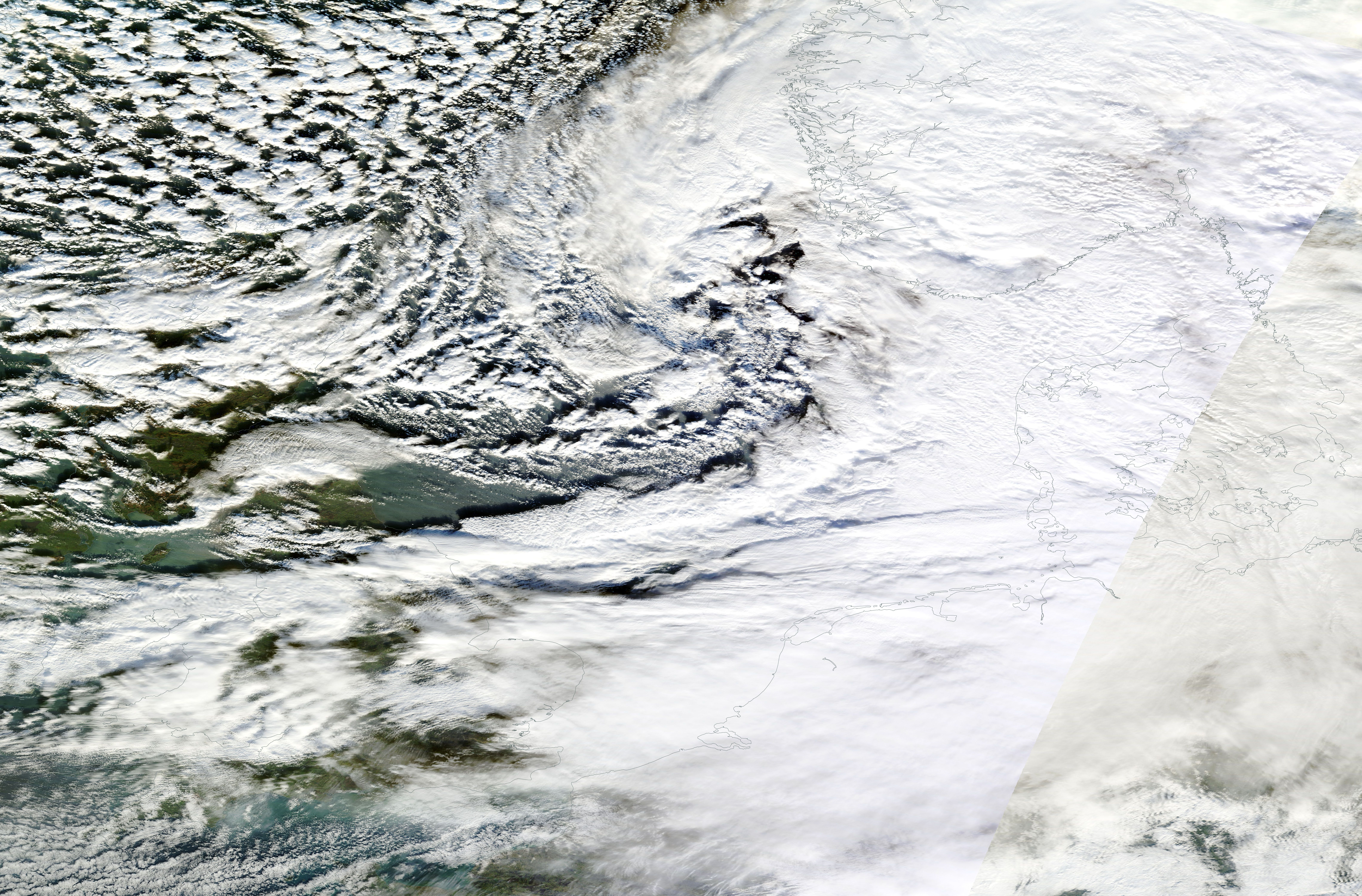
- Xaver making landfall over Norway and Denmark on 5 December 2013.

Meteorological history
- Formed: 4 December 2013
- Dissipated: 10 December 2013

Winter storm
- Highest winds: 130 km/h (81 mph), Nissum Fjord, Denmark
- Highest gusts: 229 km/h (142 mph), Aonach Mòr, Scotland, U.K.
- Lowest pressure: 962 hPa (mbar); 28.41 inHg

Overall effects
- Fatalities: 15

Cyclone Xaver (or Storm Xaver), also known as the North Sea flood or tidal surge of 2013, was a winter storm that affected northern Europe. Force 12 winds and heavy snowfall were predicted along the storm's path, and there were warnings of a significant risk of storm surge leading to coastal flooding along the coasts of the North and Irish Seas.

== Names ==
Meteorological development of Xaver

The Free University of Berlin gave the storm its name (a German form of the name Xavier), given to the Berit storm of 2011. In Poland, the storm is named Ksawery, the local translation.

The Danish Meteorological Institute abided by its alphabetical decision incepted shortly after the St. Jude storm six weeks before (which it retroactively named Allan), so named the storm Bodil.

The Swedish Meteorological Institute gave the storm the name Sven, after the name day of 5 December. In the Netherlands the storm has been co-dubbed the "Sinterklaasstorm", where 5 December is traditionally celebrated as St. Nicholas Eve. Twitter users in the UK were using the hashtags #scotstorm, #Xaver and #UKstorm.

The European Windstorm Centre, UK-based, preferred the name Cameron.

== Meteorological history ==
Xaver formed to the south of Greenland on 4 December, and explosively deepened as it moved east to pass the north of Scotland on 5 December. Over the next few days Xaver moved over Southern Norway and Sweden intensifying further, reaching its lowest pressure over the Baltic Sea.

== Forecast ==
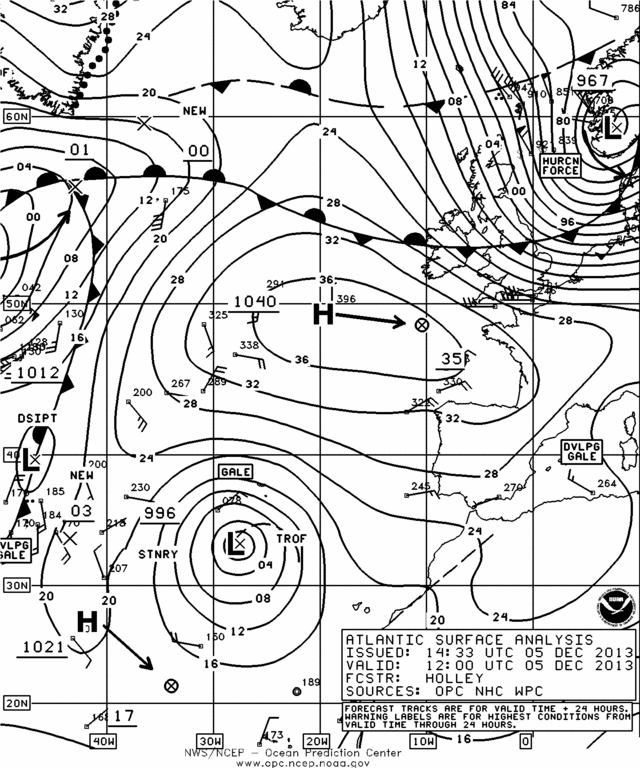
Surface pressure chart 12:00 UTC 5 December 2013

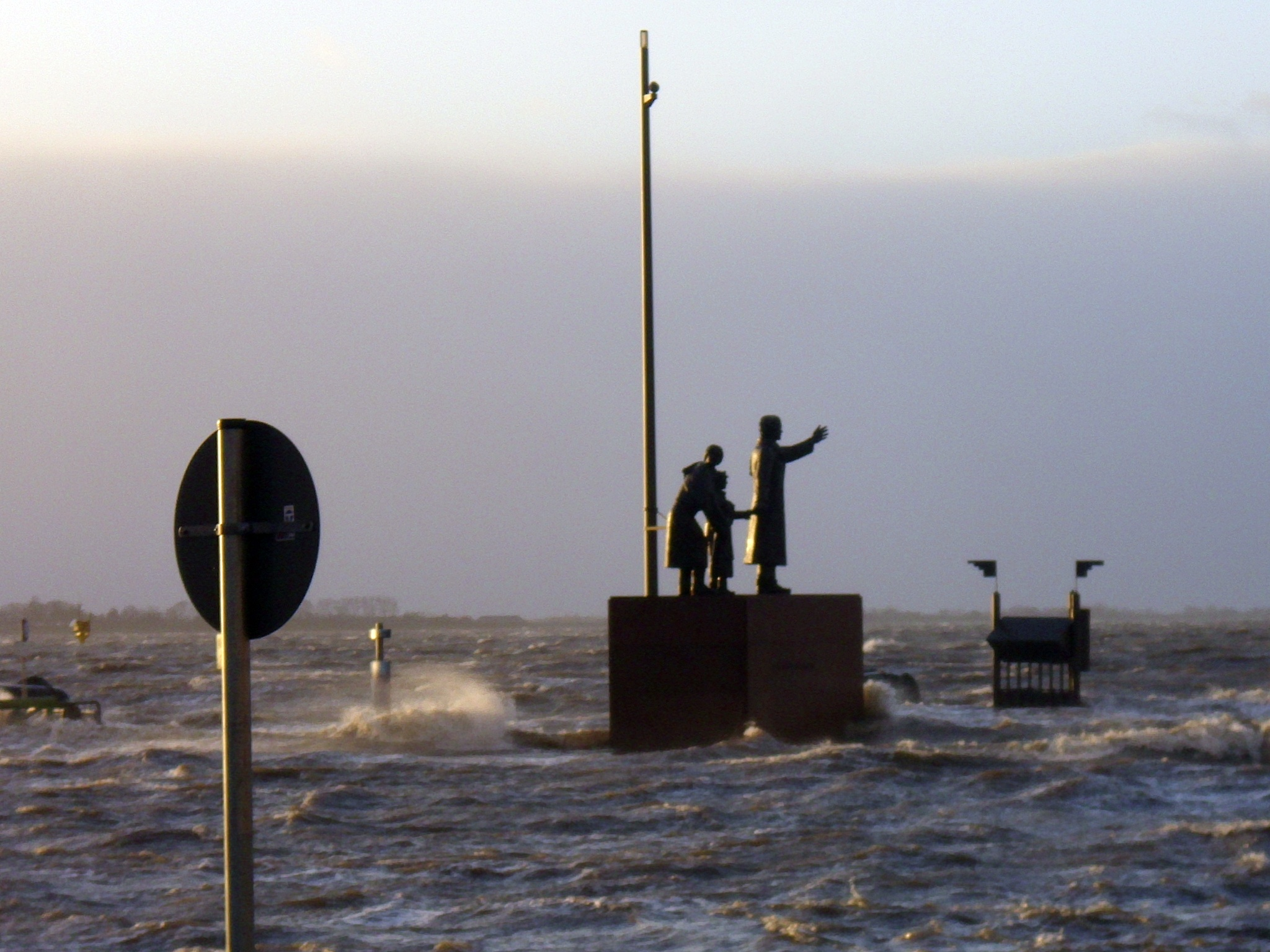
Bremerhaven flooded by the waters of Weser River

The low pressure system formed on 4 December off the west coast of Iceland and was expected to deepen explosively overnight. The UK Met Office issued an amber warning over Scotland and northern parts of England, that wind gusts may reach 145 km/h (90 mph). On 4 December the Environment Agency warned communities along the East Coast of England to prepare for the most serious tidal surge in 30 years, with a significant threat of coastal flooding between 5–7 December.

The Dutch provinces of Friesland, Groningen and North Holland were placed on Red Alert, including the Waddenzee and freshwater IJsselmeer to its south. Winds of Force 9 – 11 were forecast.

Force 12 gusts were expected in Denmark. In Sweden, the local meteorological institute gave a level 2 warning for central parts of the country due to heavy snowfall and formation of snow drifts.

An extreme weather warning was given to far northwestern Germany due to 137 km/h (85 mph) wind gusts. Meteorologists there likened the early storm readings to those of the North Sea flood of 1962 in which 340 people lost their lives in Hamburg. They qualified the forecast with a note that the improved sea defences would withstand this storm surge.

=== Preparation ===
The oil platform Buchan Alpha, northeast of Aberdeen was evacuated due to the upcoming storm. East Coast trains announced on 4 December that they expected to run fewer services the next day. First ScotRail planned to not run trains before 7:00 am on 5 December and expected around 20 routes to be closed. Network Rail advised to expect delays and disruption in northern and eastern England. In Leeds roads around Bridgewater Place, a tower, were closed to keep to a Coroner's ruling to do so when wind gusts reach 45 mph (72 km/h), after the death of a man by a truck blown over by a vortex in 2011. People living in Great Yarmouth were told to prepare to evacuate in case the Yare flooded. In London, the Thames Barrier closed around high tides to protect from any surge up the Thames Estuary, closing for the 126th time in its 31 years of service.

== Impact ==
The storm brought gusts up to 229 km/h (142 mph) to upland Scotland. Lower lands in the UK and mainland Europe saw some damaging gusts. The European coast from the Netherlands to Denmark saw notable gusts, the maximum averaging about 130 km/h (81 mph). One point on the Danish-German border peaking at 158 km/h (98 mph). Poland saw maximum gusts averaging about 137 km/h (85 mph).

Winds brought down a life-size Tyrannosaurus rex model at Klimahaus Bremerhaven.

=== Transport ===
==== Rail ====
In Scotland, at 8 a.m. on 5 December 2013 Glasgow Central station was evacuated after the glass roof was broken by flying debris. ScotRail later cancelled all services in Scotland due to debris including "trampolines, hay bales and trees" falling on the train lines. Rail Net Denmark announced that all rail transport would come to a halt for the afternoon of 5 December. This is the first time all trains in the country have been cancelled. All rail services were cancelled in the Swedish region of Skåne. Rail services across Northern Germany were affected with cancellations across Schleswig-Holstein. The East Suffolk Line (South East England/East Anglia) was closed due to flooding at six locations between Lowestoft and Haddiscoe. Services between Lowestoft and Beccles had not been restored as of 12 December 2013.

==== Road ====
Friarton Bridge, Perth, Scotland was closed due to an overturned lorry as a result of the storm, as was the Redheugh Bridge between Newcastle and Gateshead in England, as was the Ouse Bridge of M62 motorway over the Ouse.

Forth Bridge closed due to an unlawfully high-sided (in the weather) van being driven onto and abandoned on it. Tay and Skye bridges were closed.

In downtown Stavanger, Norway, on the evening of 5 December road traffic and pedestrians were forbidden due to the risk of falling tiles and masonry.

==== Sea ====
The Isle of Man Steam Packet Company cancelled ferries to and from Douglas due to winds forecast to reach Force 9. in Stavanger, Norway several local ferry services were cancelled.

==== Air ====
Glasgow, Edinburgh and Aberdeen airports were affected by the storm. With an Easyjet flight to Edinburgh struck by lightning and unable to land diverted to Newcastle. Another flight from London attempted to land at both Glasgow and Edinburgh before diverting to Manchester. Further south in England video of planes attempting to land at Birmingham Airport in cross winds was posted on the internet, with several flights being forced to re-route to other airports, after failing to land.

In Norway, Stavanger Airport was closed to inbound and outbound flights by the storm winds. Stavanger's major helicopter hub was closed and all the crafts grounded, pausing in service for North Sea oil platforms.

In Sweden Gothenburg's Göteborg Landvetter Airport and Malmö Airport saw planes grounded. Amsterdam Airport Schiphol, Hamburg Airport and Berlin Tegel all reported some disruption. Flights to and from Denmark were cancelled, with Billund Airport, Aalborg Airport and Copenhagen Airport all closed.

=== Energy disruptions ===
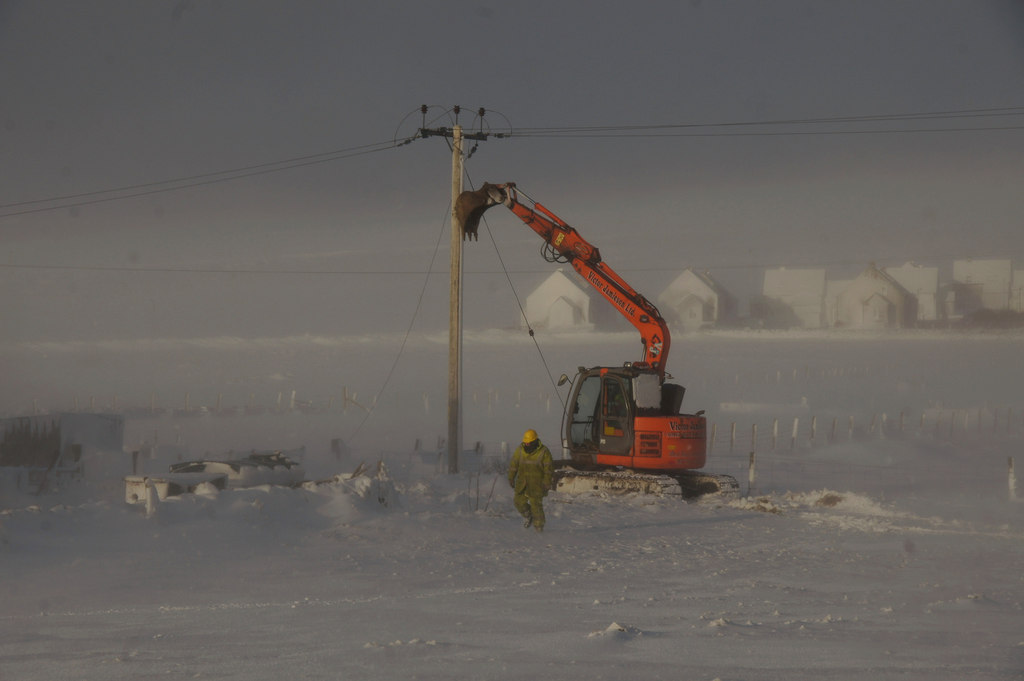
Repairing electricity cables in the wake of Xaver, Baltasound, Unst, Shetland.

Homes losing power (including brief blackouts/brownouts) totalled:

- 400,000 in Poland.
- 50,000 in Sweden.
- About 135,000 in the North East (so includes some of total below), Yorkshire and North Lincolnshire.
- 20,000 in Cumbria in the North West; and Teesside, North East England.
- 20,000 in Scotland.
- 6,500 in Northern Ireland.

== Storm surge ==
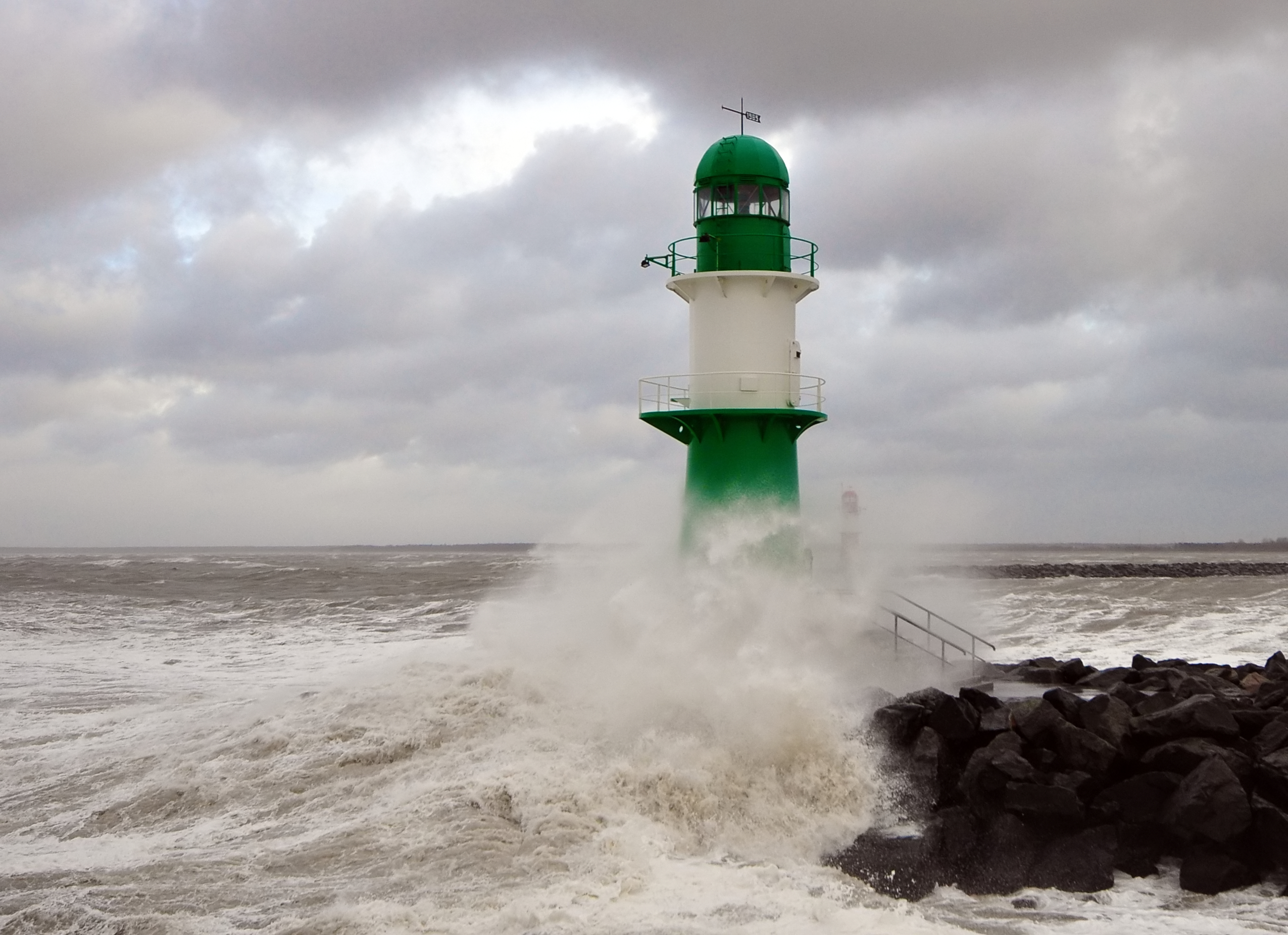
Cyclone Xaver unleashing high waves near Warnemünde, Germany

Xaver brought a significant storm surge to Northern Europe. England reported about 1,710 homes flooded and two deaths.

=== Irish Sea ===
In the Irish sea flooding was worst along the north coast of Wales and west coast of England, as the storm surge hit southwest at high tide. On Thursday, hundreds of people were evacuated from Rhyl, Denbighshire amid much flooding. North Wales saw 300 homes flooded, mostly in Rhyl. Its other notable floods were in Kinmel Bay and Llanddulas in Conwy.

Flooding in New Brighton, Merseyside, left cars and businesses flooded at Marine Point and Kings Parade. Police deterred the promenade and Vale Park from use. In Blackpool the town's North Pier was lashed, compromising some supporting piles. Water levels at both were the highest since 1987.

In Whitehaven, Cumbria the stone-built Old Quay dating from 1634 was damaged.

=== Atlantic coasts ===
On the Scottish west coast the main street and esplanade of Oban were flooded.

In Northern Ireland the town of Portstewart saw waves crash over the promenade and a children's playground flooded.

=== North Sea ===
==== Context ====
North Sea storm surges of similar scale average 1.5 per decade: 15 are listed to have occurred between 1883 and 1979.

==== Timing around coasts ====
On entering the North Sea, the storm surge propagated with the tide along the east coast of Scotland and England from north to south, proceeding anticlockwise around the southern North Sea coast to the Netherlands, Germany and Denmark.

==== Scale ====
The Environment Agency described the storm surge as the most serious in 60 years, with water heights exceeding those of the 1953 flood and 1978 North Sea storm surge at localised points in North Shields and the Humber Estuary.

Water levels during the storm surge of 2013 (metres A.O.D.)
| Location | country | Height in metres above datum | Time (UTC) and date |
|---|---|---|---|
| Lerwick | (Scotland) | 1.19 | 12:15 5/12/13 |
| Wick | (Scotland) | 2.07 | 12:45 5/12/13 |
| Aberdeen | (Scotland) | 2.65 | 15:00 5/12/13 |
| Leith | (Scotland) | 3.42 | 15:15 5/12/13 |
| North Shields | (England) | 3.58 | 16:15 5/12/13 |
| Whitby | (England) | 3.77 | 17:15 5/12/13 |
| Immingham | (England) | 5.80 | 19:00 5/12/13 |
| Cromer | (England) | 3.43 | 19:45 5/12/13 |
| Lowestoft | (England) | 2.97 | 22:30 5/12/13 |
| Harwich | (England) | 3.28 | 01:45 6/12/13 |
| Sheerness | (England) | 3.93 | 02:00 6/12/13 |
| Herne Bay | (England) | 4.20 | 01:36 6/12/13 |
| Dover | (England) | 4.72 | 00:45 6/12/13 |
| Ostend | (Belgium) | 3.75 | 02:00 6/12/13 |
| Borkum | (Germany) | 3.53 | 00:20 6/12/13 |
| Heligoland Binnenhafen | (Germany) | 3.32 | 01:08 6/12/13 |
| Cuxhaven | (Germany) | 4.28 | 01:27 6/12/13 |
| Hirtshals | (Denmark) | 1.32 | 12:00 6/12/13 |
| Gothenburg Torshamnen | (Sweden) | 1.10 | 15:43 6/12/13 |

==== England ====
The surge caused the Tyne in Newcastle to breach its banks. The Tees overtopped its estuary into the village of Port Clarance (north) causing a mass-blackout opposite, in Middlesbrough. It breached a sea wall on Greatham Creek alongside Billingham docks, later repaired using RAF Chinook helicopters.

Floods in Whitby just south of that region saw an electrical substation short out or 'explode' and flooded 200 homes. On the same the Yorkshire coast Scarborough and Bridlington had some flooding.

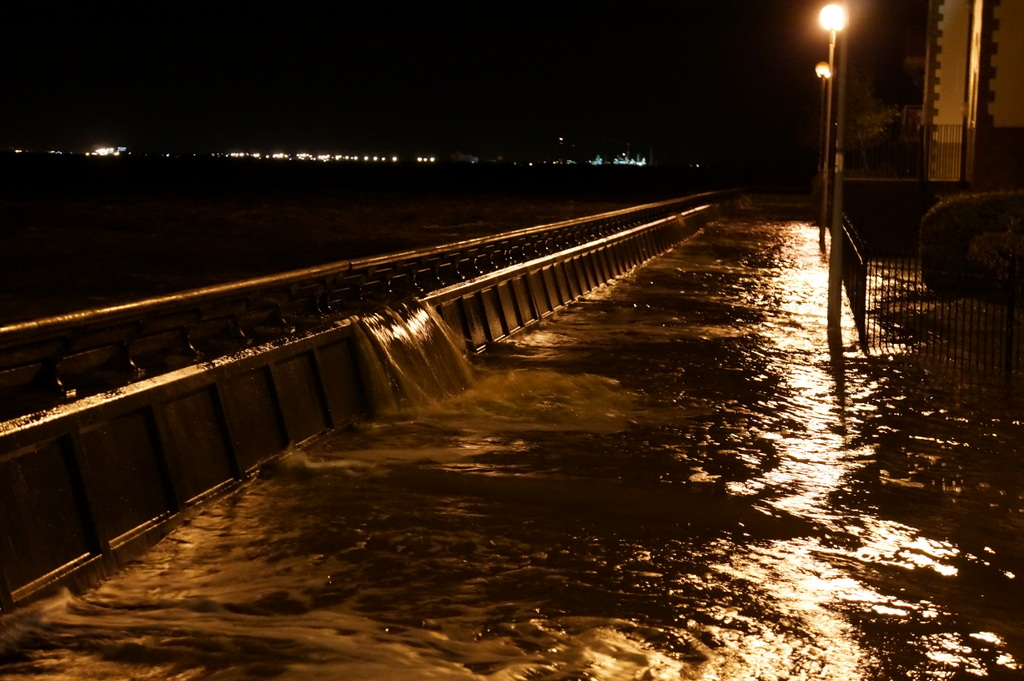
Defences overtopped at Victoria Dock, Hull

Around the Humber Estuary, Spurn Point nature reserve was closed in readiness. In Cleethorpes the promenade saw mild flooding and nearby holiday parks suffered damage. In adjoining Grimsby water overwhelmed the dock gates, partly drained in readiness, the water was able to be contained, and did not flood into the town. As the water was funnelled up the Humber Estuary the surge level increased. Humberside Police declared a state of emergency as it reached a record height of 5.8 m (19 ft) against Hull's shore. East of the city the village of Paull flooded. The River Hull tidal surge barrier was lowered, protecting swathes of the city. Some flooding occurred in the city centre, Victoria Docks, and Hessle foreshore to homes and businesses; and around Albert Dock. The A63 road through the city was closed until midday 6 December, flooded. Humberside Police released aerial footage from further up the Humber showing great flooding across North Lincolnshire and the East Riding, along the Trent and Ouse. East Riding of Yorkshire Council counted 210 homes and 45 commercial properties flooded. 500 properties flooded in North Lincolnshire across 11 villages.

At the southern Lincolnshire coasts flooding was mild and scattered, likely due to weakening and westering winds. The grey seal colony at Donna Nook flooded; wardens prepared by opening fence gates so seals could escape into the dunes and farmland. Mablethorpe saw beach debris, and in Skegness beach huts, kiosks, and the nearby visitor centre at Gibraltar Point nature reserve were damaged.

Boston, Lincolnshire had several defence walls overtopped or breached as the surge rose to levels above those seen in 1953; 800 homes across 55 streets in the town were flooded. The Borough released their CCTV footage of the defences overtopped. The Haven flooded the floor of St Botolph's Church, damaging maintenance equipment in the cellar.

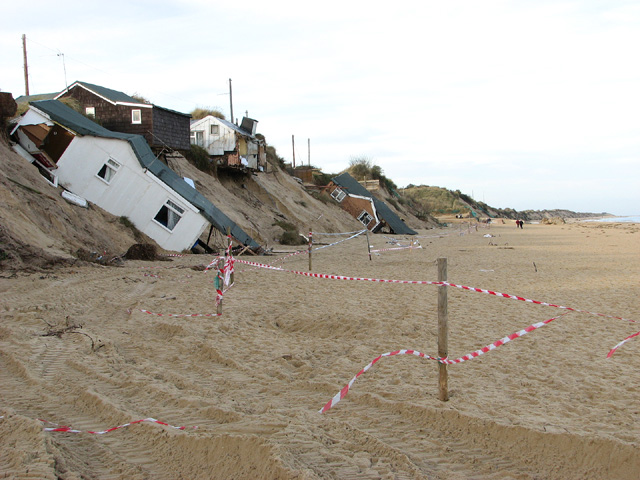
Homes undermined by the surge Hemsby Norfolk

In Norfolk the lifeboat station at Wells-next-the-sea was flooded. Cromer pier was greatly damage as waves rebounded off the sea wall damaging the deck. Beach huts were destroyed, littering the coast to Overstrand. In Happisburgh soft cliffs were further eroded leaving a home hanging over the edge and uninhabitable. At Hemsby homes built over high sand-dominated soils were undermined and parts fell into the sea.

Lowestoft, Suffolk's main harbour, railway station and a southern commercial zone flooded. Two short urban streets flooded into properties. Both bridges that connect north and south Lowestoft flooded for a few hours.

In East Suffolk, Snape on the Alde-Ore estuary and Waldringfield on Deben saw 38 homes flooded.

==== Belgium and Netherlands ====
In Belgium, Bredene municipality evacuated 2,083 residents in the district between Sas Slijkens and Spuikom along the Bruges-Ostend canal.

The storm passed without any major damage along the Belgian coast, in Ostend high water measured at 6.33 m (20.8 ft) TAW (height above mean low tide), the largest surge to reach the Belgian coast since 1953.

In the port of Antwerp, the C Ladybug came adrift, and was blown across the dock before being re-berthed with the help of two tugs.

In the Western Scheldt shipping was slowed between Vlissingen and Deurgancdok, Antwerp after 5 containers fell off a ship, 4 were empty and one loaded with tapioca, they were eventually washed up near Terneuzen.

In the Netherlands, the water reached the highest level since the North Sea flood of 1953 at 3.99 m (13.1 ft) above normal sea level. In 1953, the water rose to 4.55 m (14.9 ft) on the night of 1 February, and dykes broke in at least 90 places resulting in the worst natural disaster in the Netherlands since the 1900s. The Eastern Scheldt storm surge barrier closed all its 62 locks on Thursday night and several areas around Rotterdam experienced some flooding. Minor flooding was also reported in Dordrecht and Vlaardingen.

==== France ====
Winds Xaver proved weaker than expected on the north coast of France near Dunkirk. The maximum premium observed at low tide in Dunkirk was about 2.40 m (7.9 ft) , but other important differences between the observed water heights and predicted water heights were measured at Calais and Boulogne-sur-Mer.

==== Germany ====
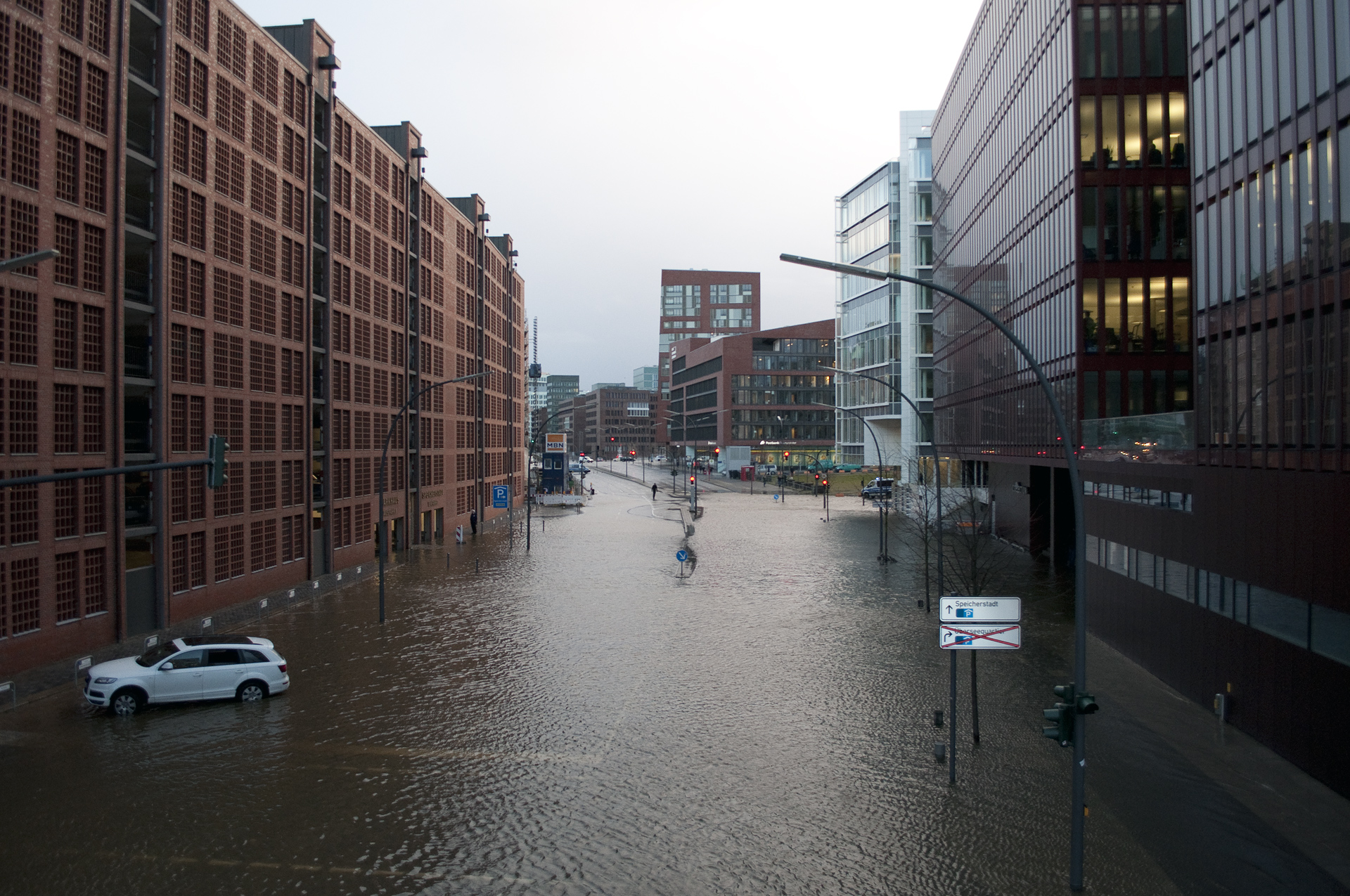
Flooding in Hamburg's HafenCity

German authorities reported waves up to six m (20 ft) high, which were the second highest on record since 1825. Some parts of Hamburg flooded, but the city saw no injuries or loss of life reported. The city closed all 38 of its flood gates, which lessened the storm's impact. The gates protect nearly $14 billion in commodities according to research from the Helmholtz-Zentrum Geesthacht Center for Materials and Coastal Research. A model Titanic was also sailed in the river Elbe.

==== Denmark and Sweden ====
In Sweden water levels were higher than expected on the western Scania coast, at 150 cm (59 in) over normal, registering up to 157 cm (62 in) above mean at Viken, Höganäs Municipality. Citizens were advised to stay indoors

In Denmark, the population was advised to remain indoors. Children were sent home from school before normal school finishing time and some parents were trapped at their place of work. The water levels were higher than expected. Holiday homes in Nørlev Strand were left undermined as the storm eroded sand dunes, along the Jutland coast.

== Casualties ==
Five people were killed in Poland, including three people in a car when a tree struck it in Poraj, northern Poland. The storm also caused two deaths in the UK and one in Denmark. In Sweden a total of seven people died.

== Aftermath ==
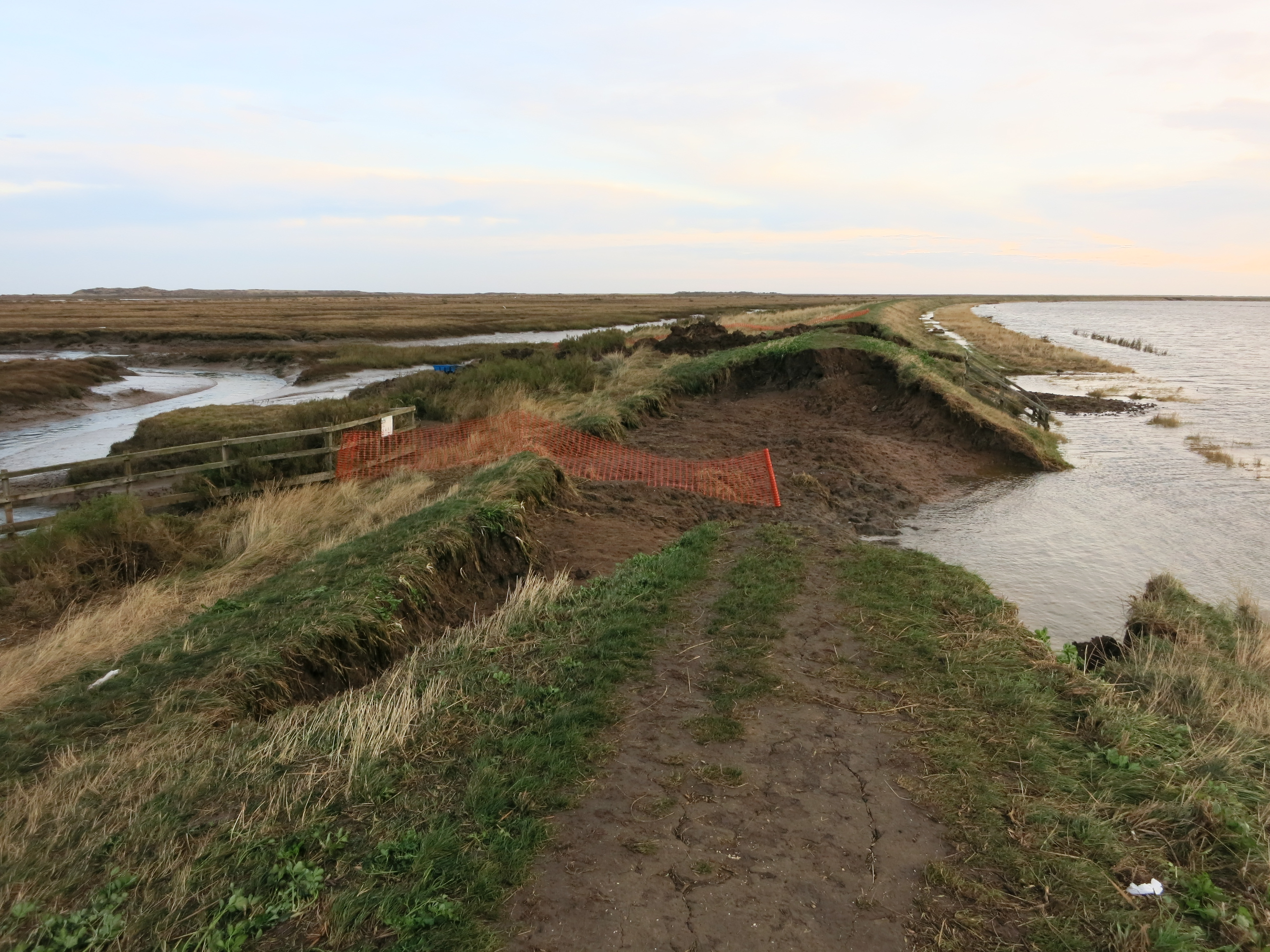
Breached sea dike at Burnham Norton, Norfolk. Seaward side left, with flooded land to the right.

The BBC addressed criticism after it suspended the regular evening news to cover the death of Nelson Mandela, while communities along the coast were still preparing for flooding. Under the Flood and Water Management Act 2010, local authorities normally investigate flooding in their boundaries, however Alun Davies the Welsh Assembly Minister for Natural Resources and Food, instructed Natural Resources Wales to co-ordinate the inquiry in Wales as one comprehensive report.

Member of Parliament for Waveney, Peter Aldous initiated a debate in the House of Commons of the United Kingdom as to what went well and what can be improved on a national level as to future flood defences, preparations and so on. In Waveney is the town of Lowestoft, which saw flooding (see above). "There is a strong sense in these communities that Parliament has not yet considered properly this narrowly averted national crisis. We need to establish what went right and also what can be improved upon." He also later stated "It is wrong to dismiss these floods as a once in a 500-year occurrence. There were floods six years ago...[The flood of 2007 caused £6 billion worth of damage]...I think with rising sea levels these are going to be a thing of the future and we do need to be looking at protecting the most vulnerable areas."

Credit Suisse by 12 December estimated the damage at between €1.4 billion and €1.9 billion. Catastrophe modeller AIR Worldwide estimated wind losses would be between €700 million and €1.4 billion. The company said that Xaver's wind impact was likely to be less than that of the St. Jude storm, as it had lower wind speeds, and expected structural damage from high winds to be more limited. Perils AG the catastrophic insurance data company gave an initial estimate of €680 million for insured property losses to the insurance industry on 16 January 2014.

The chief executive of the UK's Environment Agency said in January 2014 that the storm surge may change the coastline of the UK permanently, as the Agency weighs up whether to abandon some land losses permanently; 373 acres (151 ha) in East Anglia were still underwater in January and some defences and freshwater habitats may not be reinstated along the Norfolk-Suffolk coast. By the February after, they had repaired 7 km (4.3 mi) of defences along the Humber Estuary from Barton upon Humber to Goxhill Haven, with work west of Barton due to be completed by March. The agency secured £1.5 million to complete the works after the highest surge ever recorded in the estuary brought destruction to defences along the south bank from Whitton to East Halton.

=== Subsequent weather ===
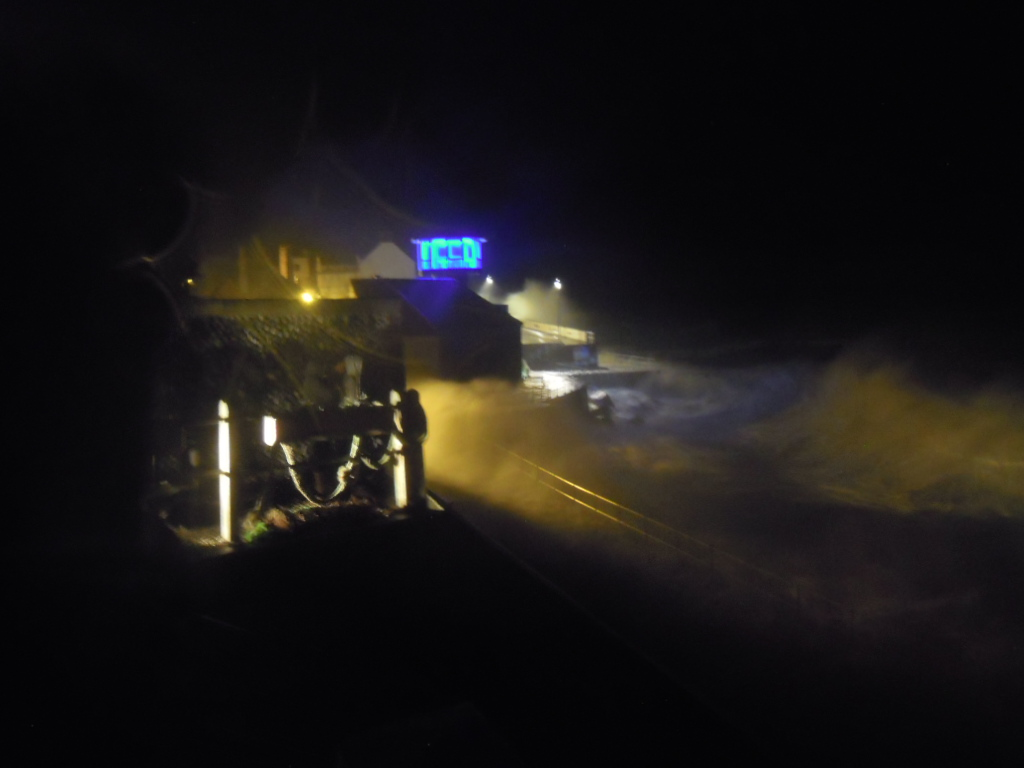
The December 2013 storm surge on Sheringham seafront.

Later that winter, Atlantic storms in Europe brought three storms to the UK around Christmas, with Cyclone Dirk bringing flooding and transport disruption prior to the holiday. Further storms in the New Year, Cyclones Anne and Christina brought further coastal flooding to the South West of England and the Welsh coast, with heavy rains leading to flooding and stormy seas leaving at least seven people dead and more than 1,700 homes and businesses flooded in England in the period between Christmas and following the Epiphany (holiday) week. The Met Office issued severe weather warnings on 7 February for the last of the storms. Much of Europe felt the effects of these Atlantic storms: flooding in France, large snowfalls in Austria and Slovenia and damaging waves in Portugal and Spain.

Parts of England had the wettest January 2014 from when records began more than 100 years before. That month more than 30 (flooding-imminent) Warnings and 160 (lesser-certainty) Alerts were made.

In February more than 200 homes were evacuated in Somerset and Devon. Police used megaphones from a helicopter to urge residents in the Somerset Levels to leave their homes. Winds of more than 140 km/h (90 mph) were recorded.

In response to the season the Government enacted the Bellwin scheme. In February David Cameron pledged to provide £100 million for clean-up and prevention. Later an extra £30 million was pledged for flood repairs and maintenance in 2014–15, completing or commencing 42 flood defence schemes. The £100 million was allocated to 2015–16.

== Highest wind gust per country ==
| Country | Highest Gust | Location |
|---|---|---|
| Ireland | 187 km/h | Malin Head |
| United Kingdom | 229 km/h | Aonach Mòr |
| France | 153 km/h | Dunkirk |
| Germany | 155 km/h | Brocken |
| Luxembourg | 90 km/h | Wincrange |
| Belgium | 125 km/h | Nieuwpoort |
| Netherlands | 137 km/h | Stavoren |
| Denmark | 179 km/h | Agger Tange |
| Sweden | 176 km/h | Kosterhavet |
| Norway | 172 km/h | Nevlunghavn |
| Poland | 163 km/h | Miedzyzdroje |

== See also ==
- 1978 North Sea storm surge
- Gale of January 1976, widely known as the "Capella" storm in Germany and the "Ruisbroek flood" in Belgium
- St. Jude storm, the previous storm to affect North West Europe
- Storm tides of the North Sea

== Literature ==
- East Riding of Yorkshire Council: Flood Investigation Report - Tidal Surge on 5 December 2013.
- Hull City Council: December 2013 Flood Investigation.
- Lincolnshire County Council Report: The East Coast Tidal Surge.
- North Norfolk Tidal Surge and Associated Coastal Flooding Event –December 2013.
