= Steknica railway station =

Railway station in Steknica, Poland

Steknica

General information
- Location: Steknica; Poland
- Coordinates: 54.715029°N 17.582031°E
- Owner: Polskie Koleje Państwowe S.A.
- Platforms: 1

Construction
- Structure type: Building: Yes (no longer used); Depot: Never existed Water tower: Never existed

History
- Former names: Flichthof until 1945
Location

Steknica is a PKP railway station in Steknica (Pomeranian Voivodeship), Poland.

== Lines crossing the station ==
Start station	End station	Line type
Pruszcz Gdański	Łeba	Passenger/Freight
