= Górka, Pomeranian Voivodeship =

Górka
- Village
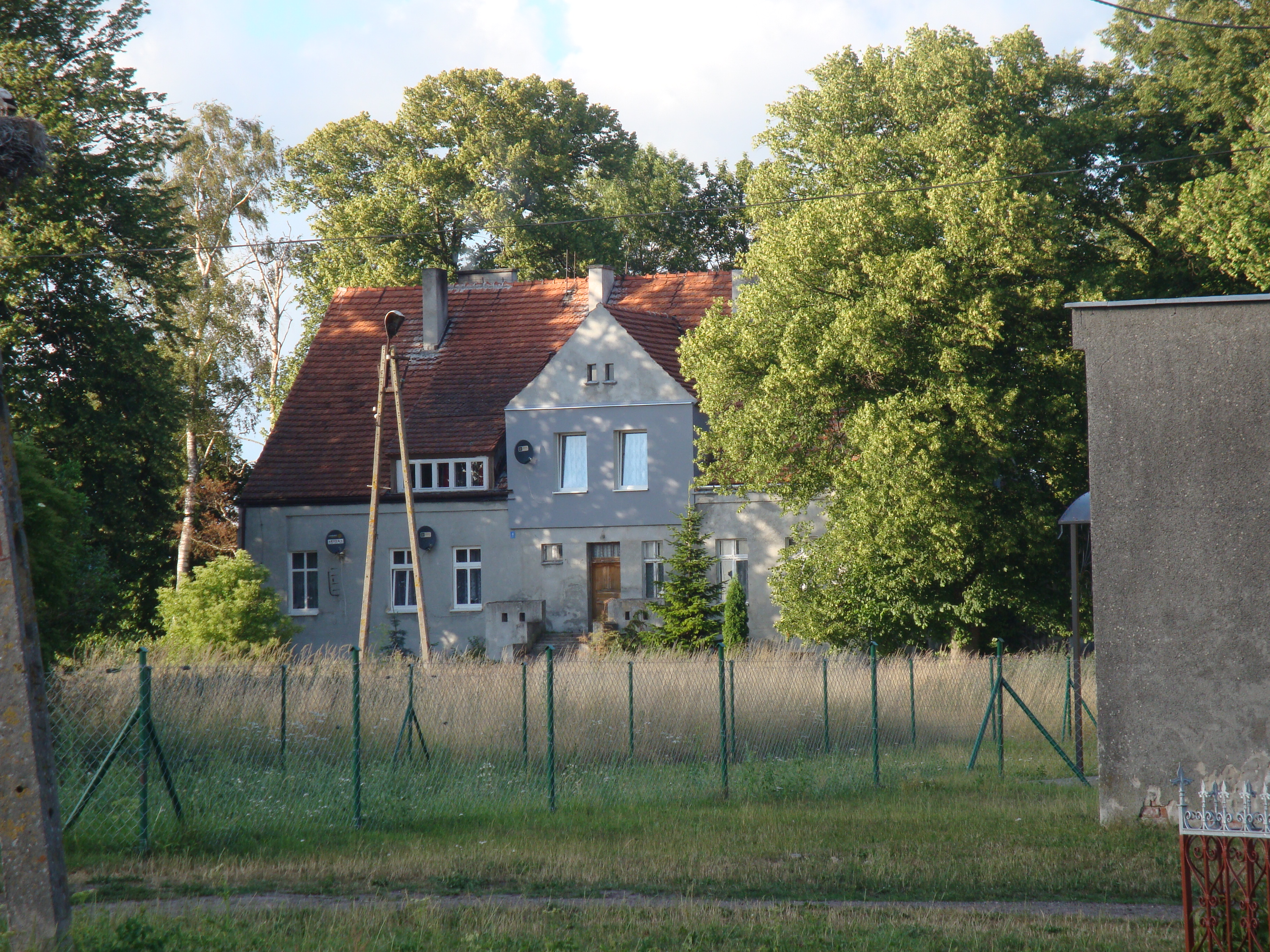

- Location within Poland
- Coordinates: 54°39′57″N 17°34′28″E
- Country: Poland
- Voivodeship: Pomeranian
- County: Lębork
- Gmina: Wicko
- Population: 90

Górka [ˈɡurka] is a village in the administrative district of Gmina Wicko, within Lębork County, Pomeranian Voivodeship, in northern Poland.

For details of the history of the region, see History of Pomerania.
