= Charbrowo =

- Village
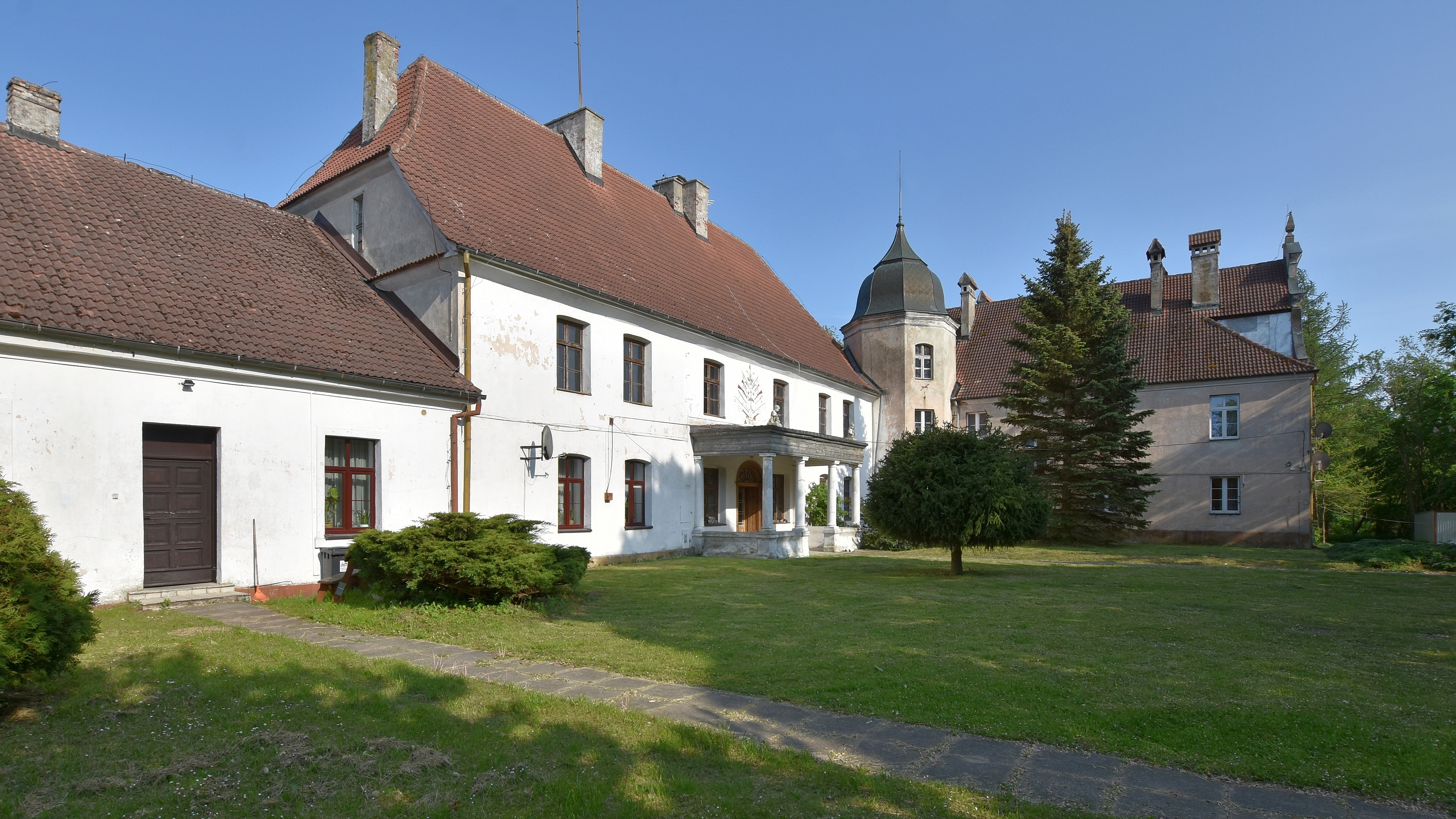
- Old manor house

- Location within Poland
- Coordinates: 54°40′40″N 17°35′47″E
- Country: Poland
- Voivodeship: Pomeranian
- County: Lębork
- Gmina: Wicko

Population
  - Total: 560
- Time zone: UTC+1 (CET)
  - Summer (DST): UTC+2 (CEST)
- Vehicle registration: GLE

Charbrowo [xarˈbrɔvɔ] (German: before 1937 Charbrow, after 1937 Degendorf) is a village in the administrative district of Gmina Wicko, within Lębork County, Pomeranian Voivodeship, in northern Poland.

It is a linear settlement.

== Etymology ==
The name of the village is derived from the Old Polish given name Charbry or Chrobry.

== History ==
In 1286, Duke Mestwin II granted the village to the Diocese of Kuyavia. Since 1564, it passed to the Wejher, Krokowski and other noble families. Polish Reformed Church services were held in the village since the 1680s, but the congregation soon became Lutheran.
