= Dychlino =

- Settlement
- Location within Poland
- Coordinates: 54°44′36″N 17°38′1″E
- Country: Poland
- Voivodeship: Pomeranian
- County: Lębork
- Gmina: Wicko

Dychlino [dɨˈxlinɔ] is a settlement in the administrative district of Gmina Wicko, within Lębork County, Pomeranian Voivodeship, in northern Poland.
