= Sarbsk =

- Village
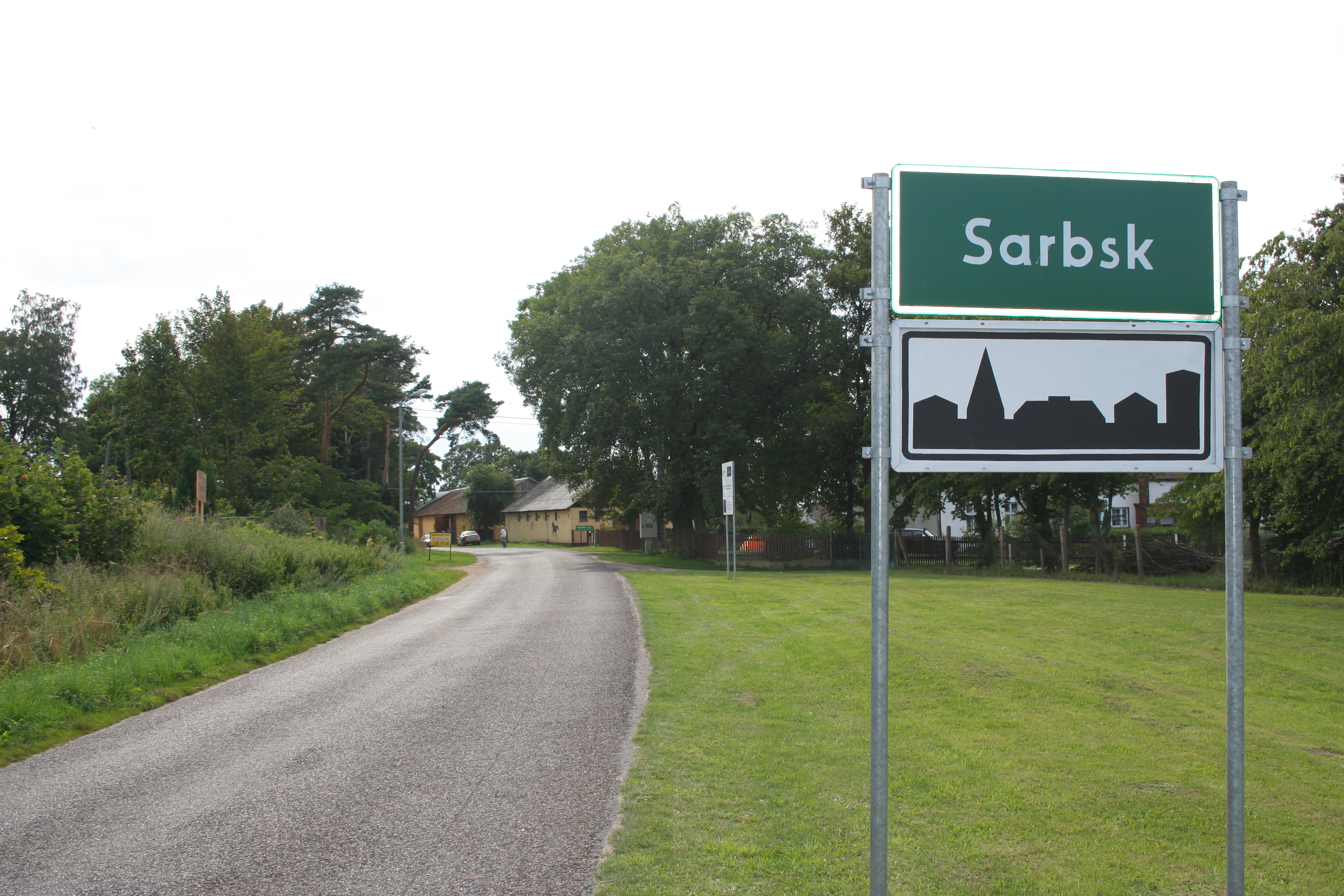
- The road to Sarbsk

- Location within Poland
- Coordinates: 54°45′5″N 17°39′57″E
- Country: Poland
- Voivodeship: Pomeranian
- County: Lębork
- Gmina: Wicko
- Population: 212

Sarbsk ([sarpsk]) is a village in the administrative district of Gmina Wicko, within Lębork County, Pomeranian Voivodeship, in northern Poland.

== Notable residents ==
- Wilhelm Wetzel (1888–1964), Wehrmacht general
