= Szczenurze =

- Village
- Location within Poland
- Coordinates: 54°43′35″N 17°37′0″E
- Country: Poland
- Voivodeship: Pomeranian
- County: Lębork
- Gmina: Wicko
- Population: 308

Szczenurze [ʂt͡ʂɛˈnuʐɛ] is a village in the administrative district of Gmina Wicko, within Lębork County, Pomeranian Voivodeship, in northern Poland.

For details of the history of the region, see History of Pomerania.
