= Skarszewo, Lębork County =

Skarszewo
- Village
- Location within Poland
- Coordinates: 54°40′5″N 17°38′24″E
- Country: Poland
- Voivodeship: Pomeranian
- County: Lębork
- Gmina: Wicko
- Population: 110

Skarszewo [skarˈʂɛvɔ] is a village in the administrative district of Gmina Wicko, within Lębork County, Pomeranian Voivodeship, in northern Poland.

For details of the history of the region, see History of Pomerania.
