= Gmina Wicko =

Gmina Wicko Wicko Commune
- Gmina
- Coat of arms
- Interactive map of Gmina Wicko
- Coordinates (Wicko): 54°40′14″N 17°37′0″E
- Country: Poland
- Voivodeship: Pomeranian
- County: Lębork
- Seat: Wicko

Area
  - Total: 216.08 km^{2} (83.43 sq mi)

Population (2006)
  - Total: 5,485
  - Density: 25.38/km^{2} (65.74/sq mi)
- Time zone: UTC+1 (CET)
  - Summer (DST): UTC+2 (CEST)
- Vehicle registration: GLE
- Website: https://www.wicko.pl

Gmina Wicko is a rural gmina (administrative district) in Lębork County, Pomeranian Voivodeship, in northern Poland. Its seat is the village of Wicko, which lies approximately 16 kilometres (10 mi) north-west of Lębork and 74 km (46 mi) north-west of the regional capital Gdańsk.

The gmina covers an area of 216.08 square kilometres (83.43 sq mi), and as of 2006 its total population is 5,485.

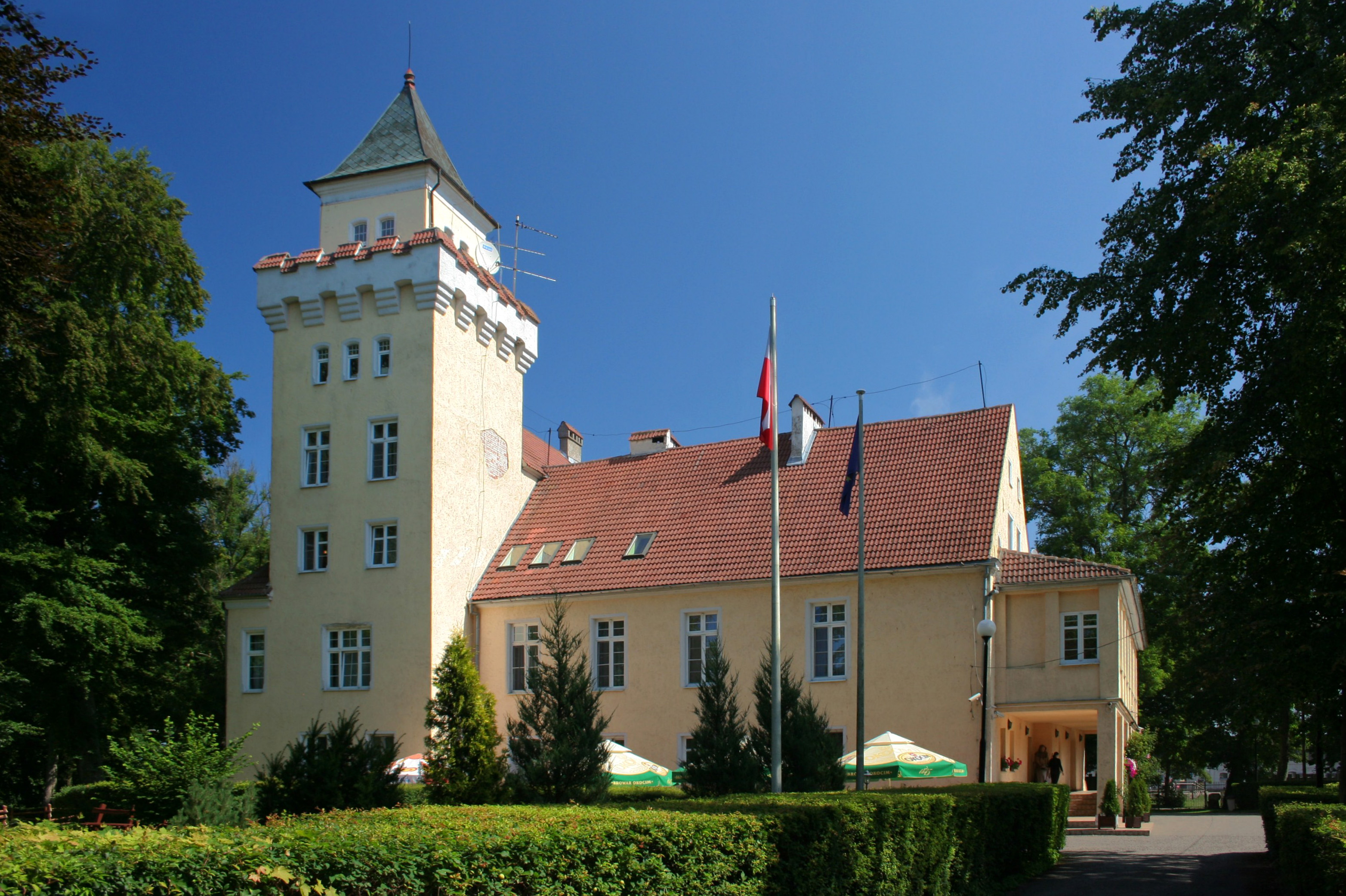
Palace in Nowęcin

== Villages ==
Gmina Wicko contains the villages and settlements of Bargędzino, Białogarda, Bieśno, Cegielnia Charbrowska, Charbrowo, Charbrowski Bór, Dychlino, Dymnica, Gąska, Gęś, Górka, Komaszewo, Kopaniewo, Krakulice, Łebieniec, Lucin, Maszewko, Nieznachowo, Nowęcin, Podróże, Poraj, Przybrzeże, Roszczyce, Sądowo, Sarbsk, Skarszewo, Steknica, Strzeszewo, Szczenurze, Szczenurze-Kolonia, Ulinia, Wicko, Wojciechowo, Wrzeście, Wrześcienko, Zachacie, Żarnowska and Zdrzewno.

== Neighbouring gminas ==
Gmina Wicko is bordered by the town of Łeba and by the gminas of Choczewo, Główczyce, Nowa Wieś Lęborska and Smołdzino.
