= Podróże =

- Settlement
- Location within Poland
- Coordinates: 54°41′45″N 17°35′23″E
- Country: Poland
- Voivodeship: Pomeranian
- County: Lębork
- Gmina: Wicko

Podróże [pɔˈdruʐɛ] is a settlement in the administrative district of Gmina Wicko, within Lębork County, Pomeranian Voivodeship, in northern Poland.

For details of the history of the region, see History of Pomerania.
