= Lucin, Pomeranian Voivodeship =

Lucin
- Settlement
- Location within Poland
- Coordinates: 54°44′21″N 17°34′13″E
- Country: Poland
- Voivodeship: Pomeranian
- County: Lębork
- Gmina: Wicko

Lucin [ˈlut͡ɕin] is a settlement in the administrative district of Gmina Wicko, within Lębork County, Pomeranian Voivodeship, in northern Poland.

For details of the history of the region, see History of Pomerania.
