= Wicko, Pomeranian Voivodeship =

Wicko
- Village
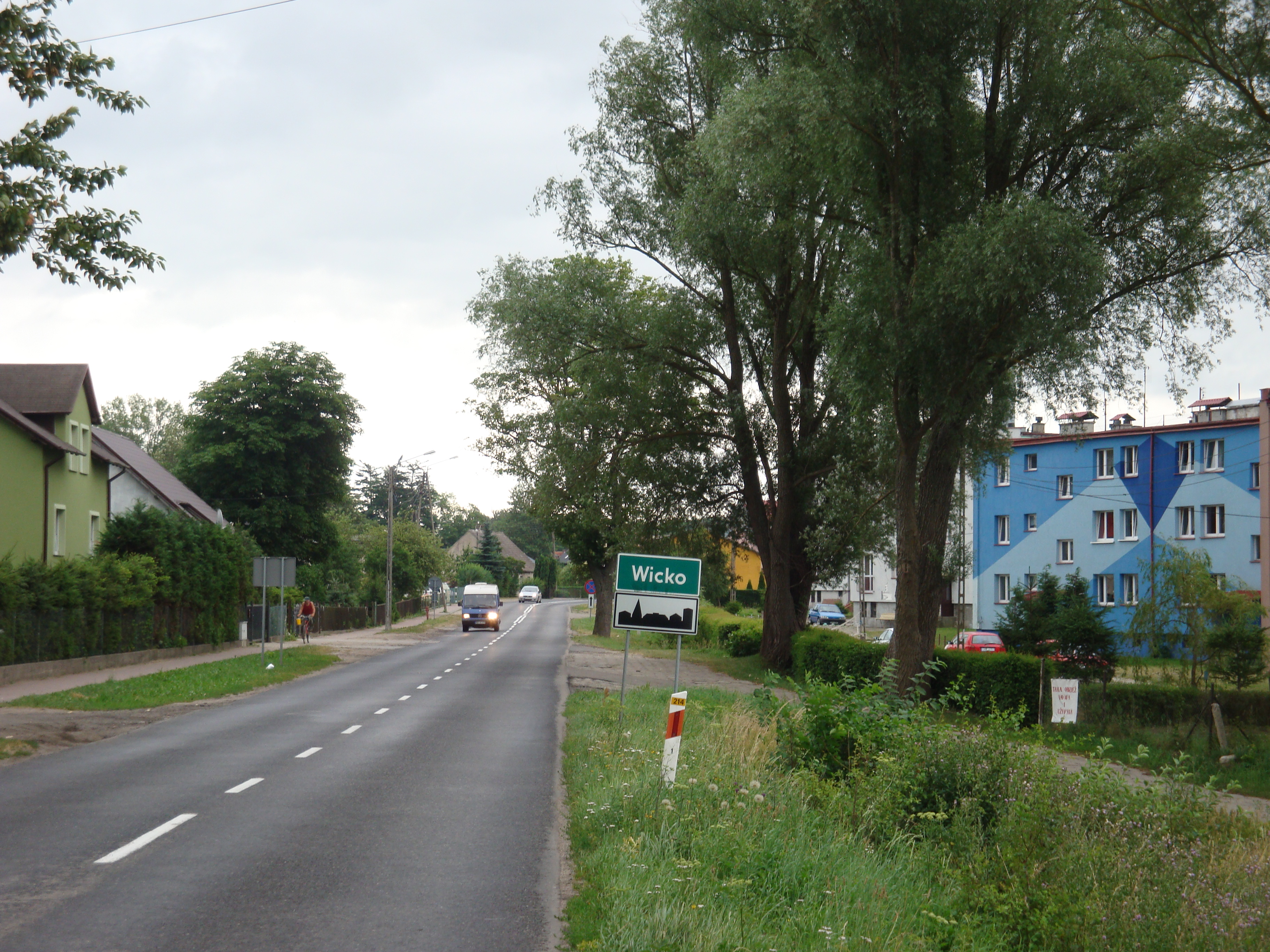

- Flag Coat of arms

- Location within Poland
- Coordinates: 54°40′14″N 17°37′0″E
- Country: Poland
- Voivodeship: Pomeranian
- County: Lębork
- Gmina: Wicko

Population
  - Total: 690
- Postal code: 84-352

Wicko [ˈvit͡skɔ] (German: Vietzig) is a village in Lębork County, Pomeranian Voivodeship, in northern Poland. It is the seat of the gmina (administrative district) called Gmina Wicko.
