= Krakulice =

- Village
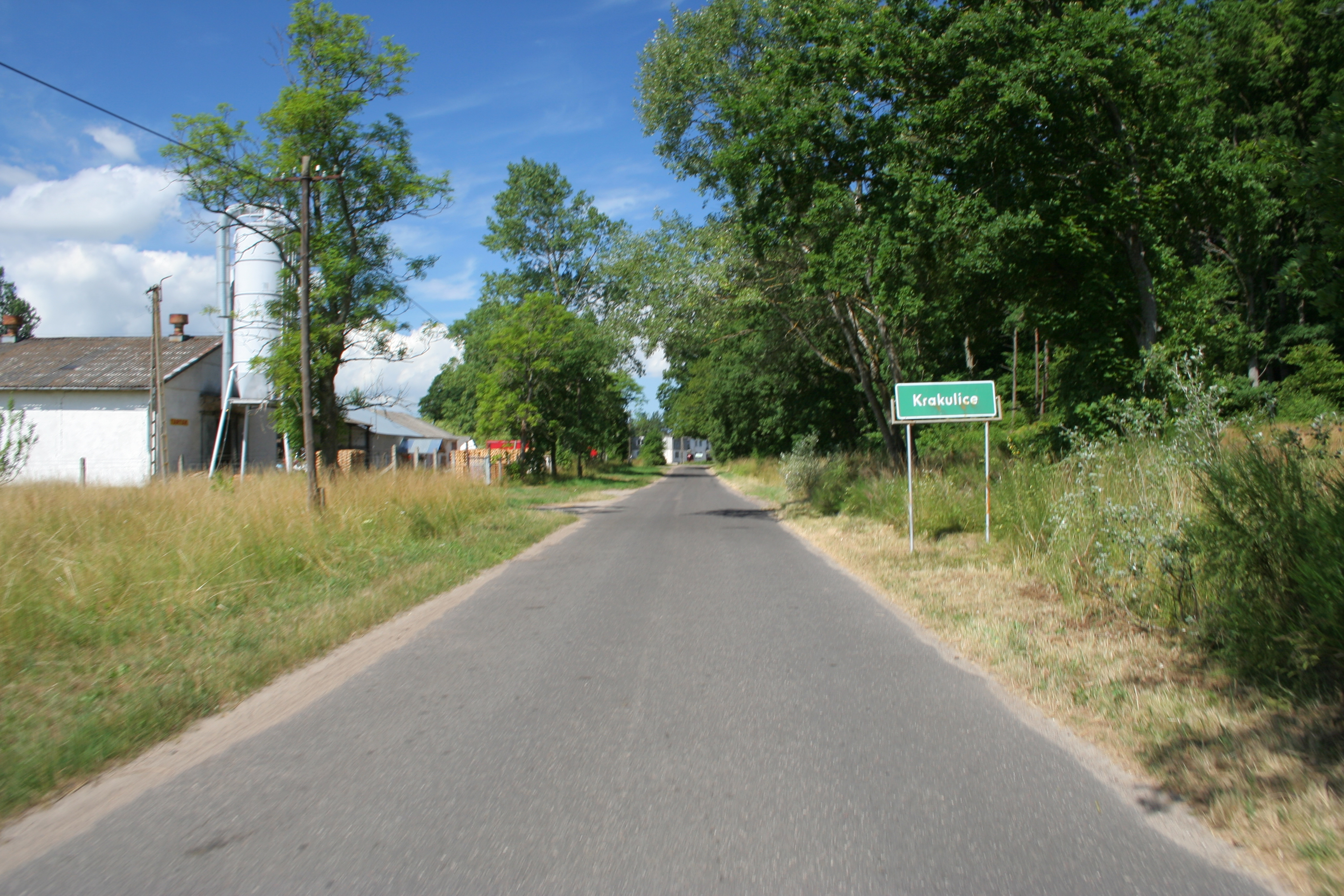

- Location within Poland
- Coordinates: 54°41′39″N 17°32′58″E
- Country: Poland
- Voivodeship: Pomeranian
- County: Lębork
- Gmina: Wicko
- Population: 230

Krakulice [krakuˈlit͡sɛ] is a village in the administrative district of Gmina Wicko, within Lębork County, Pomeranian Voivodeship, in northern Poland.

For details of the history of the region, see History of Pomerania.
