= Wojciechowo, Pomeranian Voivodeship =

Wojciechowo
- Village
- Location within Poland
- Coordinates: 54°41′21″N 17°46′22″E
- Country: Poland
- Voivodeship: Pomeranian
- County: Lębork
- Gmina: Wicko
- Population: 120

Wojciechowo (Polish: [vɔjt͡ɕɛˈxɔvɔ]) is a village in the administrative district of Gmina Wicko, within Lębork County, Pomeranian Voivodeship, in northern Poland.

For details of the history of the region, see History of Pomerania.
