= Zdrzewno =

- Village
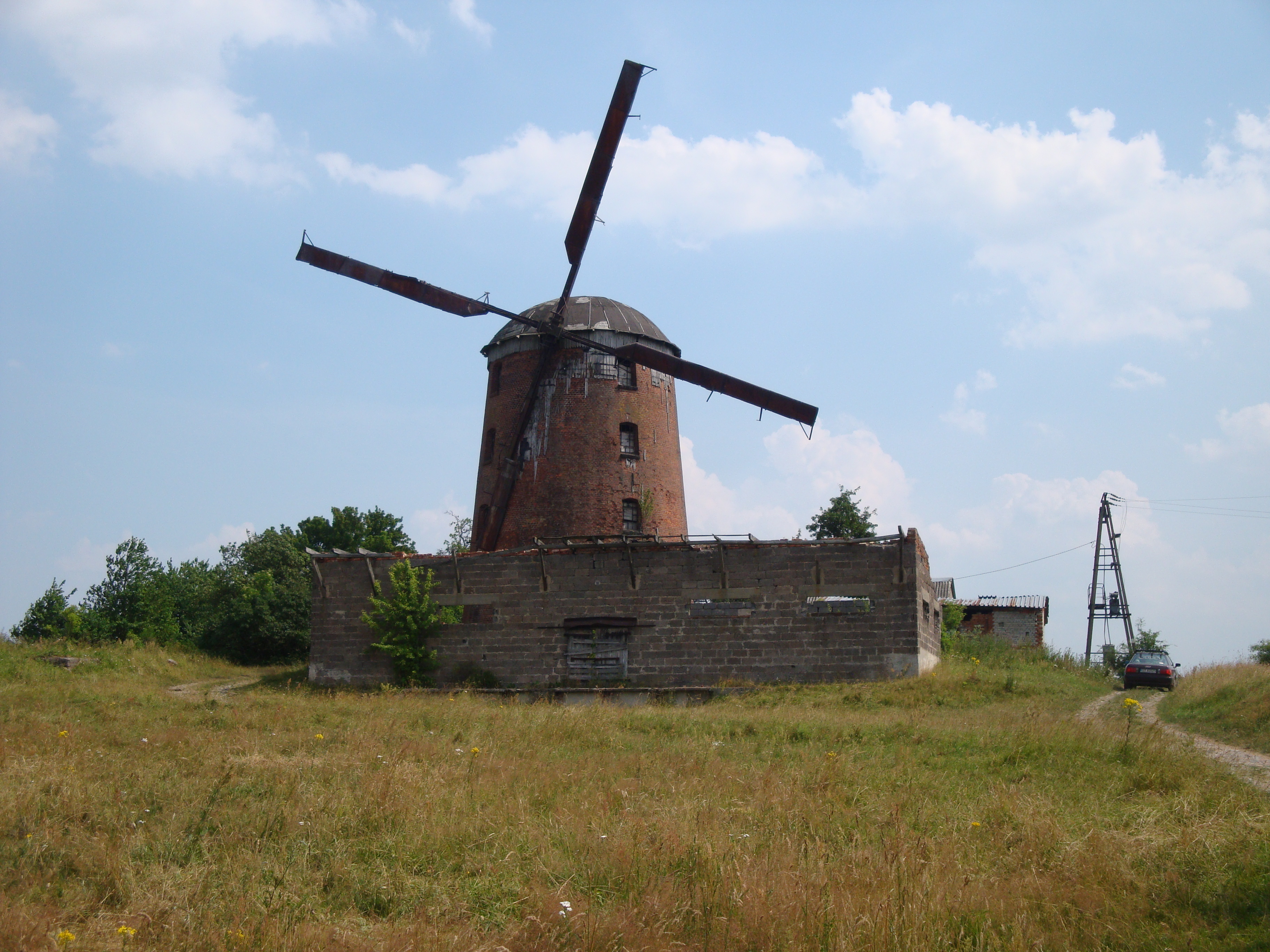
- Windmill (built in 1765)

- Location within Poland
- Coordinates: 54°40′14″N 17°42′27″E
- Country: Poland
- Voivodeship: Pomeranian
- County: Lębork
- Gmina: Wicko
- Population: 225

Zdrzewno [ˈzdʐɛvnɔ] is a village in the administrative district of Gmina Wicko, within Lębork County, Pomeranian Voivodeship, in northern Poland.

For details of the history of the region, see History of Pomerania.
