= Nowęcin =

- Village
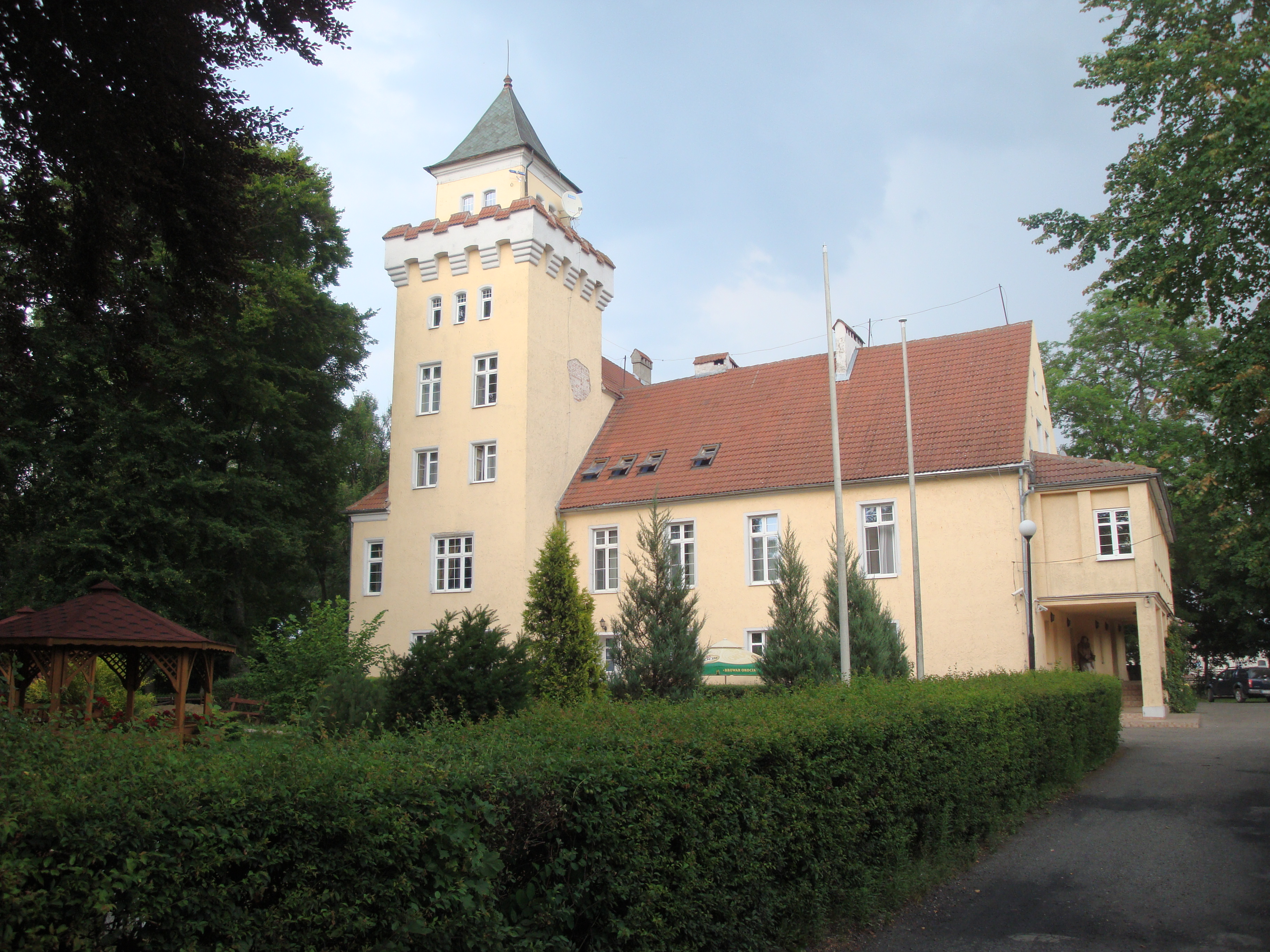
- Palace, presently hotel

- Location within Poland
- Coordinates: 54°45′8″N 17°35′16″E
- Country: Poland
- Voivodeship: Pomeranian
- County: Lębork
- Gmina: Wicko
- Population: 382

Nowęcin [nɔˈvɛnt͡ɕin] (German: Neuhof) is a village in the administrative district of Gmina Wicko, within Lębork County, Pomeranian Voivodeship, in northern Poland.

For details of the history of the region, see History of Pomerania.
