= Cegielnia Charbrowska =

- Settlement
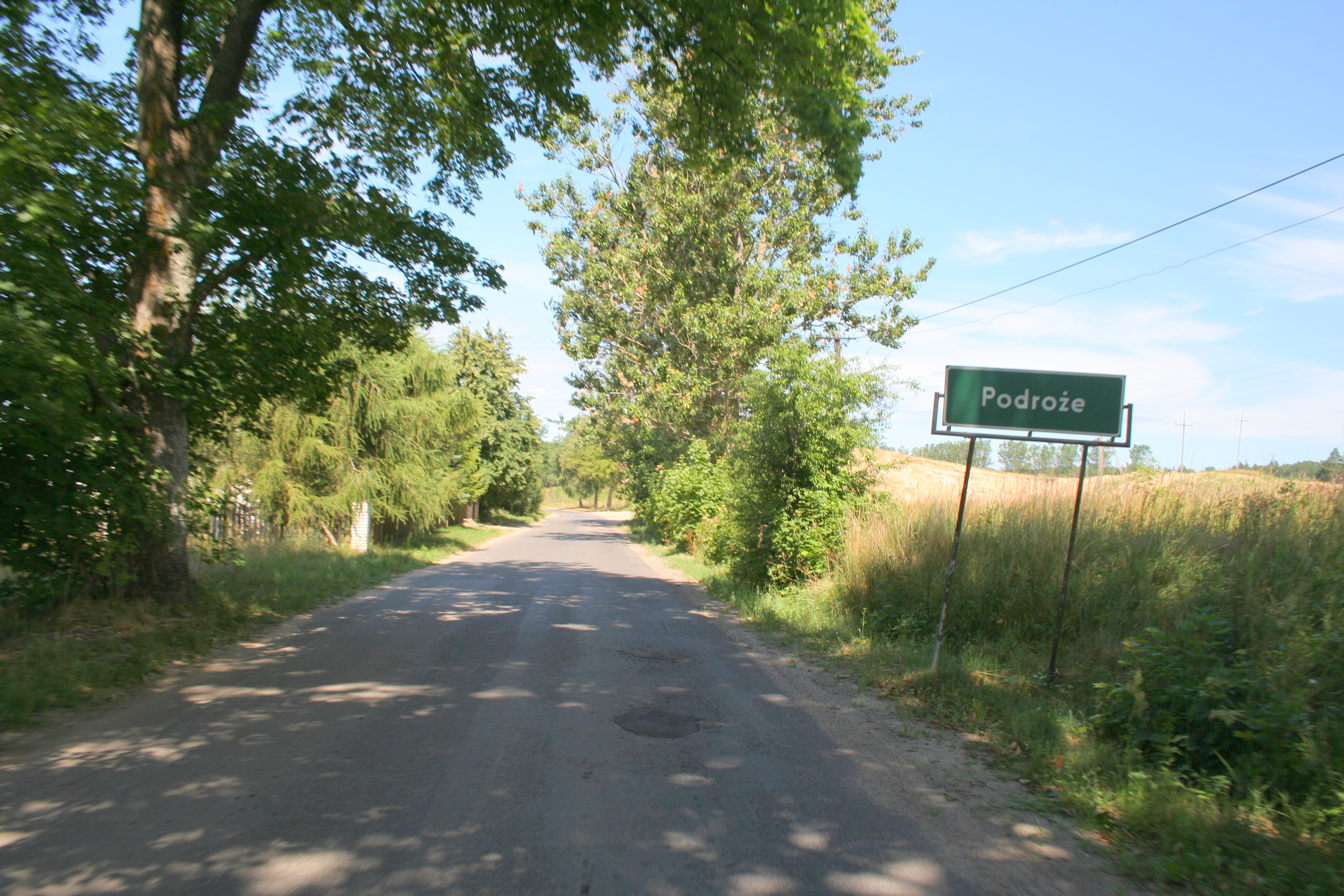

- Location within Poland
- Coordinates: 54°41′17″N 17°34′18″E
- Country: Poland
- Voivodeship: Pomeranian
- County: Lębork
- Gmina: Wicko

Cegielnia Charbrowska [t͡sɛˈɡʲɛlɲa xarˈbrɔfska] is a settlement in the administrative district of Gmina Wicko, within Lębork County, Pomeranian Voivodeship, in northern Poland.

For details of the history of the region, see History of Pomerania.
