= Komaszewo =

- Village
- Location within Poland
- Coordinates: 54°41′24″N 17°40′50″E
- Country: Poland
- Voivodeship: Pomeranian
- County: Lębork
- Gmina: Wicko
- Population: 81

Komaszewo [kɔmaˈʂɛvɔ] is a village in the administrative district of Gmina Wicko, within Lębork County, Pomeranian Voivodeship, in northern Poland.

For details of the history of the region, see History of Pomerania.
