= Kopaniewo =

- Village
- Location within Poland
- Coordinates: 54°40′1″N 17°42′24″E
- Country: Poland
- Voivodeship: Pomeranian
- County: Lębork
- Gmina: Wicko

Kopaniewo [kɔpaˈɲɛvɔ] is a village in the administrative district of Gmina Wicko, (Vietzig, Lauenburg) within Lębork County, Pomeranian Voivodeship, in northern Poland.

For details of the history of the region, see History of Pomerania.
