= Wrzeście, Lębork County =

Wrzeście
- Village
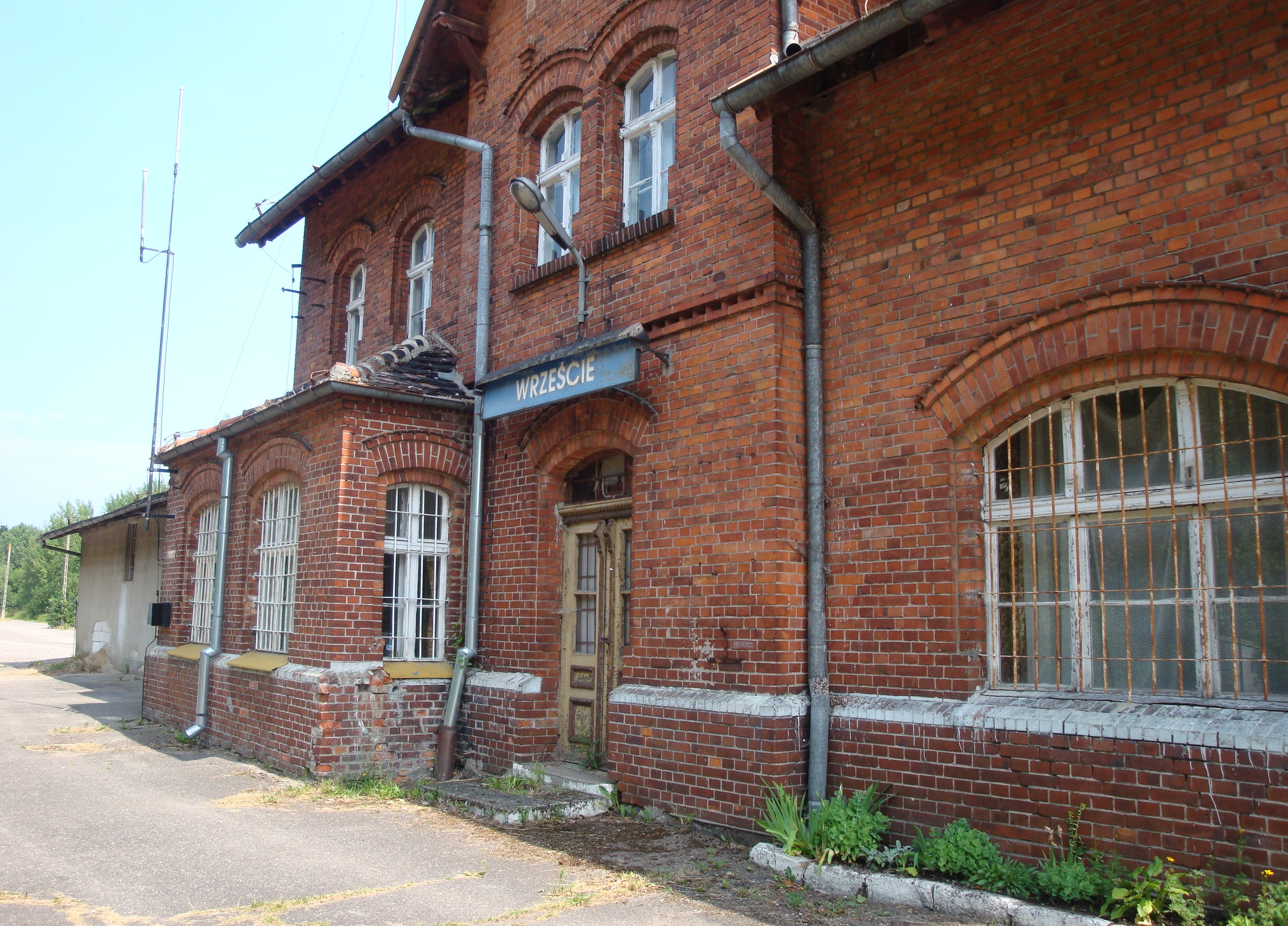
- Train station in Wrzeście

- Location within Poland
- Coordinates: 54°41′15″N 17°38′12″E
- Country: Poland
- Voivodeship: Pomeranian
- County: Lębork
- Gmina: Wicko
- Population: 284

Wrzeście [ˈvʐɛɕt͡ɕɛ] is a village in the administrative district of Gmina Wicko, within Lębork County, Pomeranian Voivodeship, in northern Poland.

For details of the history of the region, see History of Pomerania.
