= Poraj, Pomeranian Voivodeship =

Poraj
- Settlement
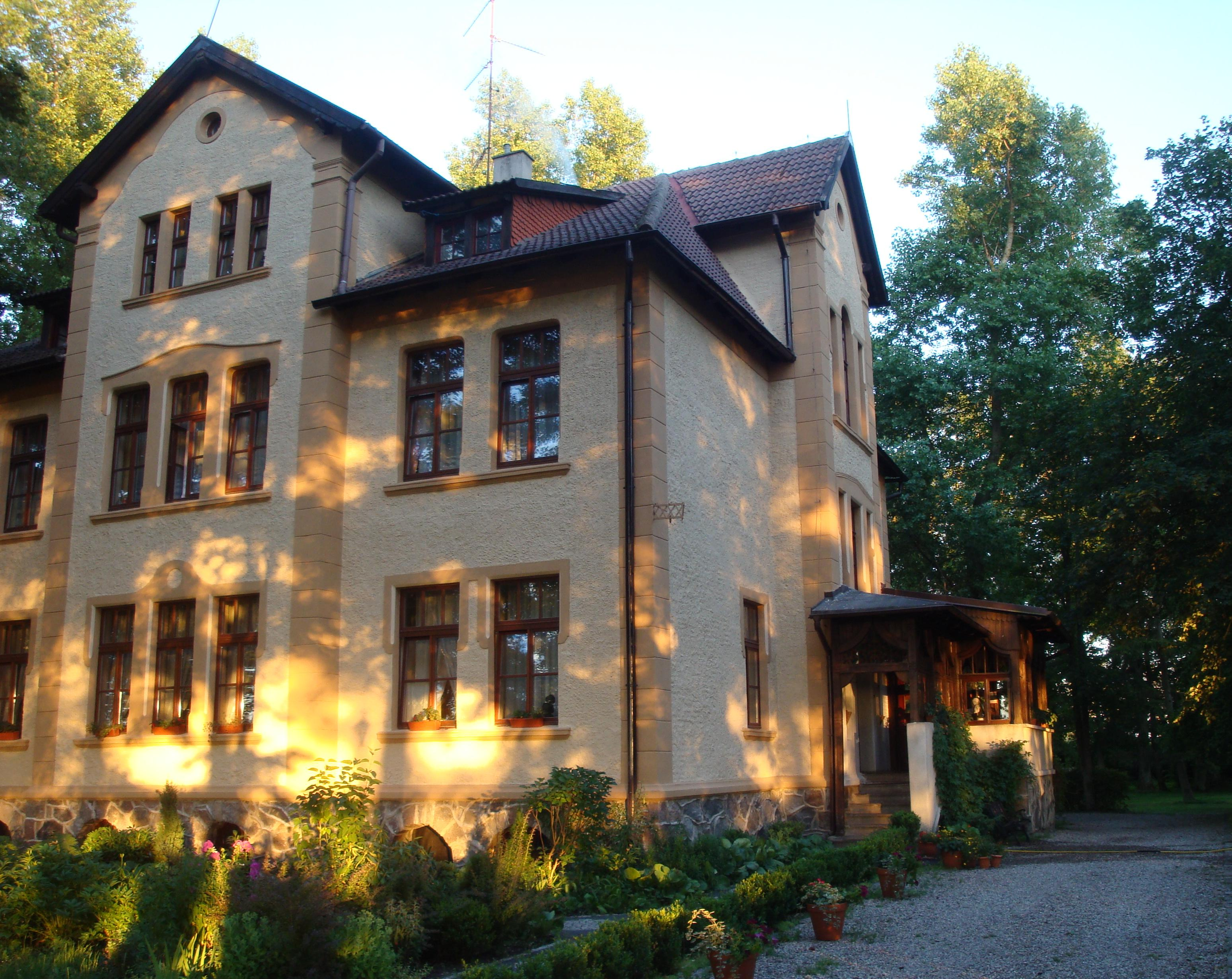
- building of Peat Institute (presently restaurant)

- Location within Poland
- Coordinates: 54°39′25″N 17°35′24″E
- Country: Poland
- Voivodeship: Pomeranian
- County: Lębork
- Gmina: Wicko

Poraj [ˈpɔrai̯] is a settlement in the administrative district of Gmina Wicko, within Lębork County, Pomeranian Voivodeship, in northern Poland.

For details of the history of the region, see History of Pomerania.
