= Nieznachowo =

- Settlement
- Location within Poland
- Coordinates: 54°42′20″N 17°41′28″E
- Country: Poland
- Voivodeship: Pomeranian
- County: Lębork
- Gmina: Wicko

Nieznachowo [ɲɛznaˈxɔvɔ] is a settlement in the administrative district of Gmina Wicko, within Lębork County, Pomeranian Voivodeship, in northern Poland.

For details of the history of the region, see History of Pomerania.
