= Bargędzino =

- Village
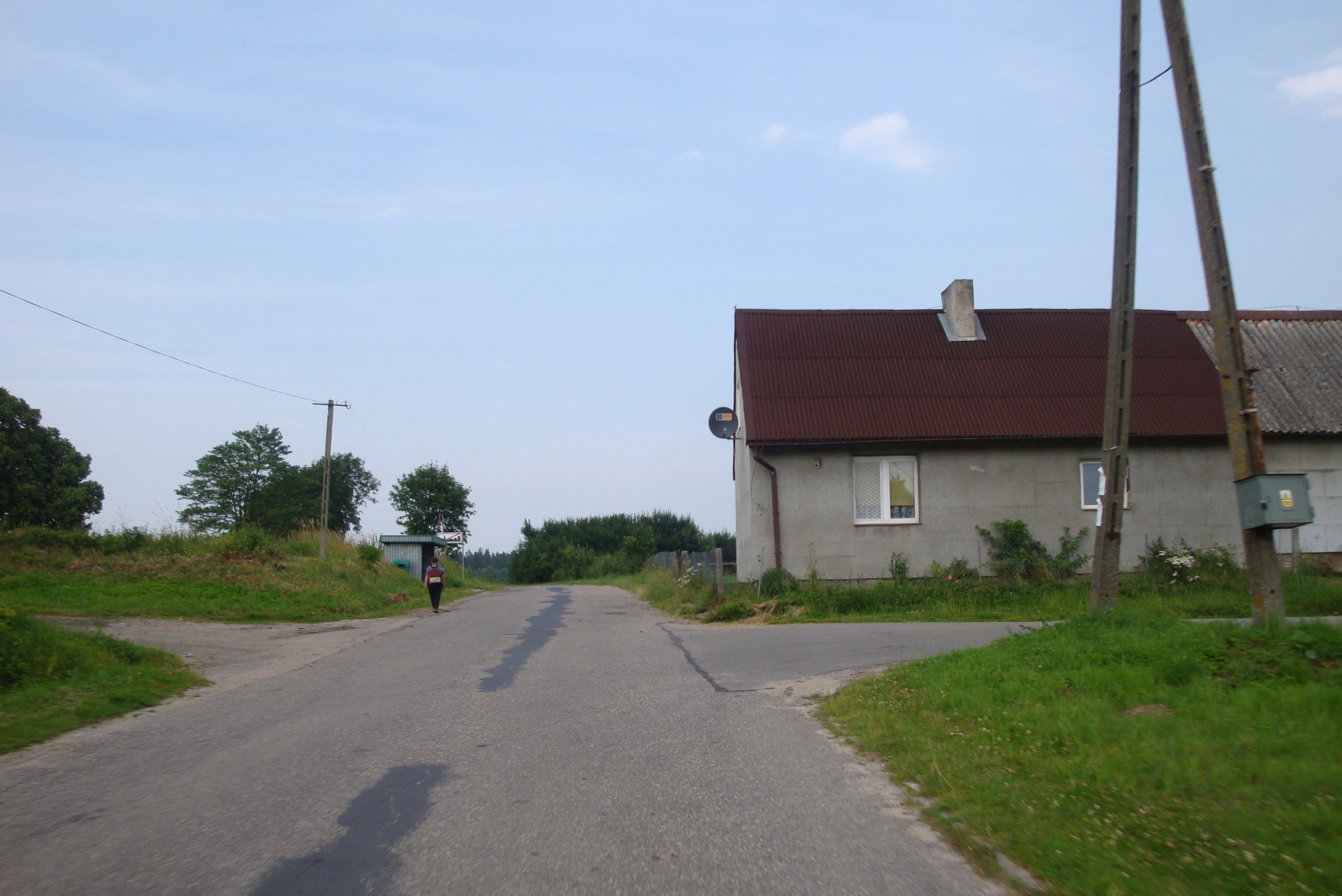

- Location within Poland
- Coordinates: 54°43′52″N 17°43′29″E
- Country: Poland
- Voivodeship: Pomeranian
- County: Lębork
- Gmina: Wicko
- Population: 93

Bargędzino [barɡɛnˈd͡ʑinɔ] (German: Bergensin) is a village in the administrative district of Gmina Wicko, within Lębork County, Pomeranian Voivodeship, in northern Poland.

For details of the history of the region, see History of Pomerania.
