= Wrzeście railway station =

Railway station in Lębork County, Poland

Wrzeście
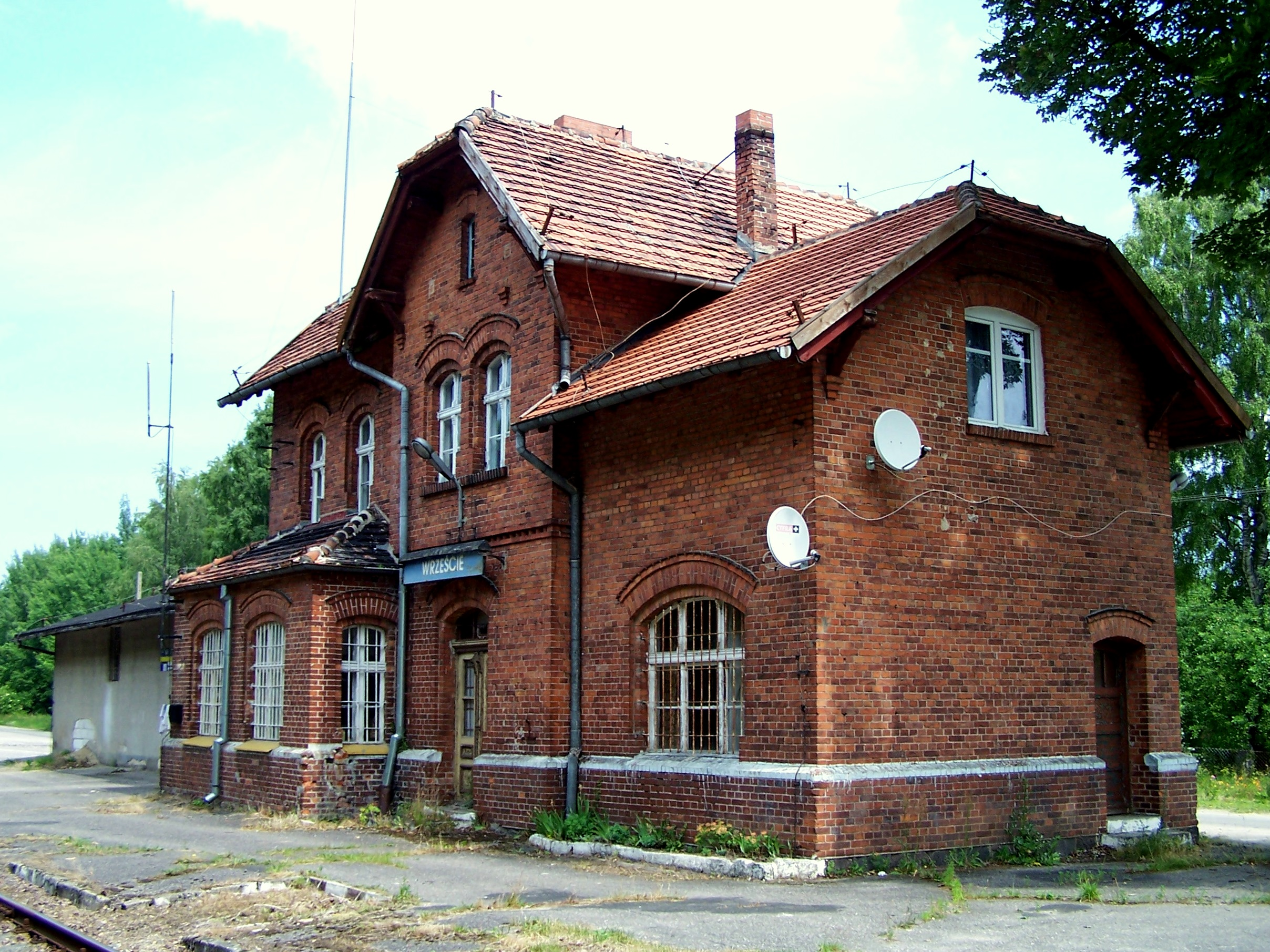
- Wrzeście railway station

General information
- Location: Wrzeście; Poland
- Coordinates: 54.677515°N 17.668312°E
- Owner: Polskie Koleje Państwowe S.A.
- Platforms: 1

Construction
- Structure type: Building: Yes; Depot: Never existed Water tower: Never existed

History
- Former names: Freest (bei Leba) until 1945
Location

Wrzeście is a PKP railway station in Wrzeście (Pomeranian Voivodeship), Poland.

== Lines crossing the station ==
Start station	End station	Line type
Pruszcz Gdański	Łeba	Passenger/Freight
Wrzeście	Bargędzino	Dismantled
