= Bargędzino railway station =

Railway station in Poland

Bargędzino

General information
- Location: Bargędzino; Poland
- Coordinates: 54°43′27″N 17°43′15″E
- Owner: Polskie Koleje Państwowe S.A.
- Platforms: None

Construction
- Structure type: Building: No; Depot: No; Water tower: No
Location

Bargędzino is a non-operational PKP railway station in Bargędzino (Pomeranian Voivodeship), Poland.

== Lines crossing the station ==
| Start station | End station | Line type |
|---|---|---|
| Wrzeście | Bargędzino | Dismantled |
