= Voivodeship road 101 =

Road in Poland

Voivodeship Road 101
- Droga wojewódzka nr 101
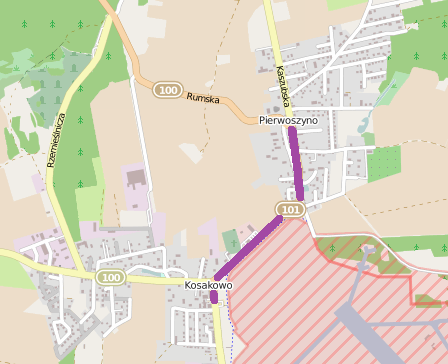

Route information
- Maintained by Wielkopolski Zarząd Dróg Wojewódzkich
- Length: 2 km (1.2 mi)
- Existed: Late 2002 or early 2003–12 April 2023

Major junctions
- From: DW 100 in Pierwoszyno
- To: Kosakowo

Location
- Country: Poland
- Regions: Pomeranian Voivodeship
- Major cities: Rumia

Highway system
- National roads in Poland; Voivodeship roads
← DW 100	→ DW 102

Voivodeship Road 101 (Polish: Droga wojewódzka nr 101, abbreviated DW 101) is a former voivodeship road. It ran through the Pomeranian Voivodeship from voivodeship road 100 in Pierwoszyno to Kosakowo where there is the new international airport. The route was concurrent with voivodeship road 100 on its entire length.

On 12 April 2023, DW 101 lost provincial road status, along with DW 100.

== Major cities and towns along the route ==
- Pierwoszyno
- Kosakowo

== Route plan ==
km	Icon	Name	Crossed roads
x		Rumia	—
0		Pierwoszyno	
2		Kosakowo	—
