= Jan Radtke =

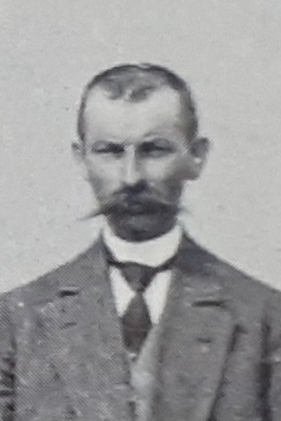
- Jan Radtke in c. 1910.

Mayor (sołtys) of Gdynia
- In office 30 September 1919 – 10 April 1926
- Preceded by: Aaron Jansen
- Succeeded by: August Krause

Mayor (wójt) of the municipality of Chylonia
- In office 1919 – 10 April 1926

Personal details
- Born: 9/10 February 1872 Dębogórze, Kingdom of Prussia, German Empire (now part of Poland)
- Died: 22 December 1958 (aged 86) Gdynia, Poland
- Party: National Democracy

Jan Radtke (Polish: [ˈjan ˈrat.tkɛ]; 9/10 February 1872 – 22 December 1958) was a politician, who served as the mayor (sołtys) of Gdynia, and the mayor (wójt) of the municipality of Chylonia, from 1919 to 1926.

== Biography ==
Jan Radtke was born on either 9 or 10 February 1872, in the village of Dębogórze, then located in the West Prussia, Kingdom of Prussia, German Empire, and currently, within the Pomeranian Voivodeship, Poland. The exact date of his birth remains contested. The documentation from his baptism lists the date as 9 February. However, Radtke himself listed the date as 10 February. It is possible that he intentionally listed this date instead, as it was the date on which the Poland's Wedding to the Sea ceremony was held in 1920.

He was the son of Józef Radtke, an owner of 50 hectares of farmland, and Julianna Radtke (née Magryan). He had eight siblings, including four sisters and four brothers.

Following his graduation from the school of agriculture in Sopot, and finishing an internship in the Neustadt District Hall in Wejherowo, he began working as an administrator of a small landed property in West Prussia. In 1910, he moved to Gdynia, where in 1912, he built a summer vacation pension guest house.

In accordance to the Treaty of Versailles signed in 1919, the village of Gdynia, and its surroundings area, were to be incorporated into Poland. As such, on 30 September 1919, Jan Radtke was elected as the mayor (sołtys) of Gdynia, replacing Aaron Jansen. Following ascending to the office, he established Polish as the official language, and flew the flag of Poland at his headquarters. Soon after he also became the mayor (wójt) of the municipality of Chylonia, which included Gdynia. The area was officially incorporated into Poland in February 1920. He was re-elected to both offices in 1922, and remained in office until 10 April 1926.

In 1926, he was chosen to be the deputy mayor of Gdynia. However, he was not approved in the position by the voivode of the Pomeranian Voivodeship, due to concerns of potential nepotism, as he was closely related to two members of the city council. Instead, he became a councillor. He was member of the National Democracy party.

He began the major development of Gdynia, including development of the tourist industry, and turning the settlement into a main seaport of Poland, rival to the nearby seaport in Gdańsk, which was part of the Free City of Danzig. He also began the application process for Gdynia to receive town privileges, which it eventually did in 1926.

He was involved in various cultural and activist organizations, including Stanica Kashubian Language Appreciation Society, Sokół Polish Gymnastic Society, Hen Guild, and Property Owners Association. He was also an honour patron of the Pomeranian School of Arts, and from 1928 he was a member of the first management of the Gdynia-based branch of the Polish Maritime Tourism Society, and from 1931, a chairperson of the Dzwon Bałtycki Association of Song Societies.

On 1 September 1939, the forces of Nazi Germany began the Invasion of Poland, starting the Second World War. On 13 September, Gdynia was captured, begging the occupation. Following that, the occupant forces has arrested Radtke, placing him for several months in the Potulice concentration camp. After being released, he returned to Gdynia, and stayed in his relatives' house in the neighbourhood of Pustki Cisowskie.

Radtke died on 22 December 1958. His funeral turned into a huge manifestation of Gdynia inhabitants. He was buried in Witomino Cemetery.

== Commemorations ==
- On 16 September 1989, on the façade of his house at 2 Dziesiątego Lutego Street, was placed a commemorative plaque dedicated to Radtke. It was done from the initiative of the Kashubian–Pomeranian Association.
- In 1991, a street in Gdynia was named after him.
- For several years, the 14th High School at Dąbek Square in Gdynia, was named after him. The school was closed in 2018.
- The character of Radtke, portrayed by Andrzej Grąziewicz, appears in the 2009 historical film Born of the Sea directed by Andrzej Kotkowski.

== Orders and decorations ==
- Silver Cross of Merit (7 February 1930)
