= Mosti =

Mosti or MOSTI may refer to:

- Donji Mosti, a village in Croatia
- Ondina mosti, a species of sea snail
- Portrait of Vincenzo Mosti, a painting by Titian
- Ministry of Science, Technology and Innovation (Malaysia)

== People ==
- Luca Mosti (born 1998), Italian footballer
- Nicola Mosti (born 1998), Italian footballer

== See also ==
- Mostis, king of the Caeni c. 130 BC-c. 90 BC
- Mosty (disambiguation)
