= Kõpu Nature Reserve =

Protected area in Estonia

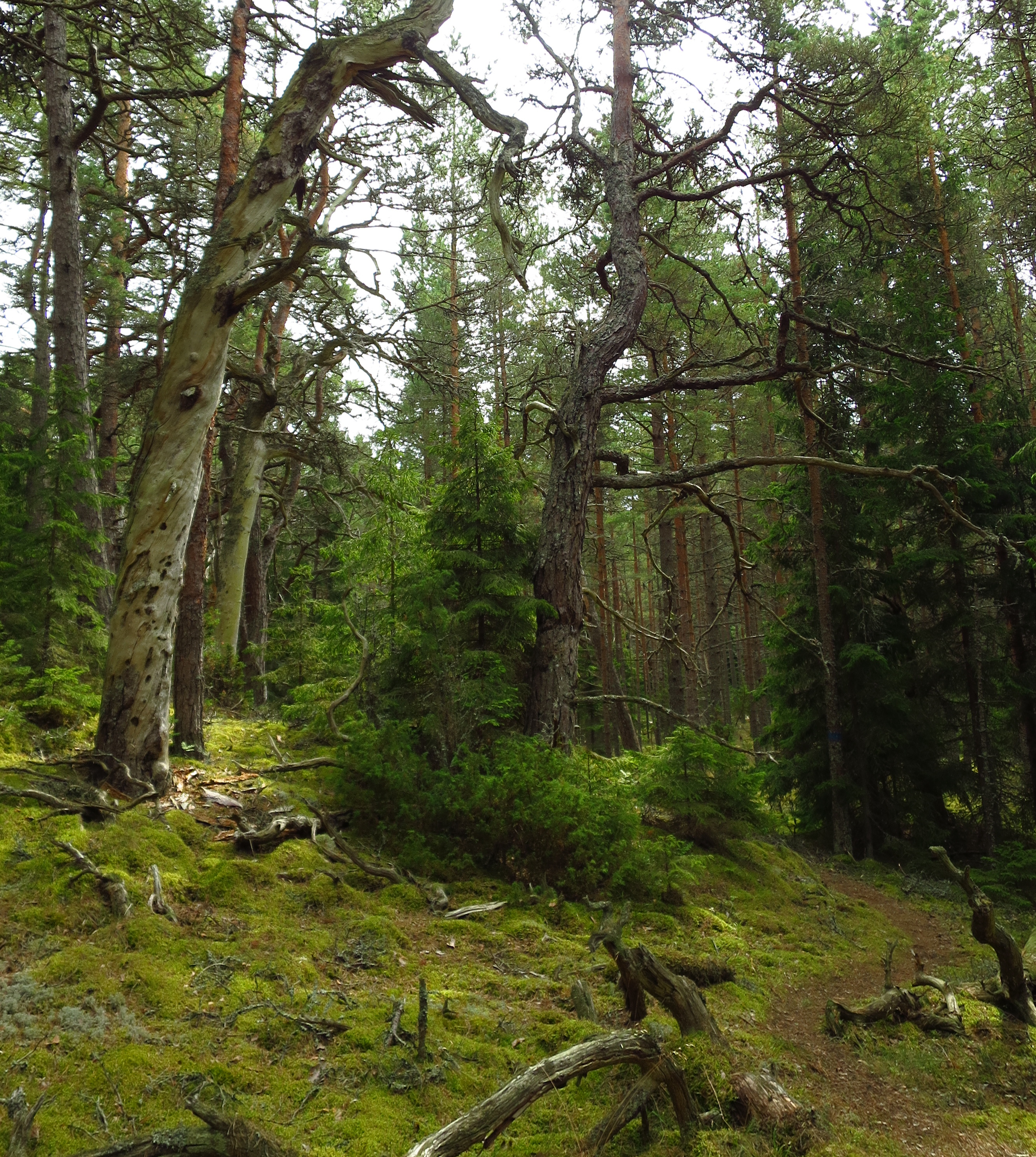

- Location within Estonia
- Location: Estonia
- Nearest city: Kärdla
- Coordinates: 58°55′22″N 22°07′08″E
- Area: 3,064 ha (7,570 acres)

Kõpu Nature Reserve is a nature reserve situated on Hiiumaa in western Estonia, in Hiiu County.

Kõpu Nature Reserve has been established to protect the biodiversity in this unusual area on Kõpu peninsula. The nature reserve contains forest of many types, including heath forest and natural old-growth forest, and also fens, beach ridges and dunes. It is one of the most geologically diverse parts of Hiiumaa, and the location of the island's highest point. Rare plants that find protection in the reserve include sea holly, black bogrush and several species of orchids. From the fauna, the European nightjar, black woodpecker and European honey buzzard are examples.
