= Mosty =

Mosty may refer to:

- Dlouhé Mosty, part of Františkovy Lázně, Czech Republic
- Mosty u Českého Těšína, village near Český Těšín, Czech Republic, now part of that town
- Mosty u Jablunkova, village in Frýdek-Místek District, Czech Republic
- Mosty, Lublin Voivodeship (east Poland)
- Mosty, Łódź Voivodeship (central Poland)
- Mosty, Świętokrzyskie Voivodeship (south-central Poland)
- Mosty, Lębork County in Pomeranian Voivodeship (north Poland)
- Mosty, Puck County in Pomeranian Voivodeship (north Poland)
- Mosty, Puck County - Mòstë
- Mosty, West Pomeranian Voivodeship (north-west Poland)
- Mosty Wielkie
- Mosty Małe
- Nowe Mosty
- Masty, Belarus
- Nichole Leigh Mosty, American-born Icelandic politician
