= Gmina Kosakowo =

Gmina Kosakowo Kosakowo Commune
- Gmina
- Coat of arms
- Interactive map of Gmina Kosakowo
- Coordinates (Kosakowo): 54°35′22″N 18°28′54″E
- Country: Poland
- Voivodeship: Pomeranian
- County: Puck
- Seat: Kosakowo

Area
  - Total: 47.37 km^{2} (18.29 sq mi)

Population (2006)
  - Total: 8,087
  - Density: 170.7/km^{2} (442.2/sq mi)
- Website: http://www.kosakowo.pl

Gmina Kosakowo (Kashubian: Kòsôkòwò) is a rural gmina (administrative district) in Puck County, Pomeranian Voivodeship, in northern Poland. Its seat is the village of Kosakowo, which lies approximately 14 kilometres (9 mi) south-east of Puck and 27 km (17 mi) north of the regional capital Gdańsk.

The gmina covers an area of 47.37 square kilometres (18.3 sq mi), and as of 2006 its total population is 8,087.

The gmina contains part of the protected area called Coastal Landscape Park.

== Villages ==
Gmina Kosakowo contains the villages and settlements of Dębogórze, Dębogórze-Wybudowanie, Kazimierz, Kosakowo, Mechelinki, Mosty, Pierwoszyno, Pierwoszyńskie Pustki, Pogórze, Rewa, Stefanowo, Suchy Dwór and Zaklęty Zamek.

== Neighbouring gminas ==
Gmina Kosakowo is bordered by the towns of Gdynia and Rumia, and by the gmina of Puck.

== Nature protection ==
- Communal Association of Municipalities "Dolina Redy i Chylonki"
- Coastal Landscape Park
- Nature Reserve "Mechelińskie Łąki"
