= Suchy Dwór, Pomeranian Voivodeship =

Suchy Dwór
- Village
- Location within Poland
- Coordinates: 54°34′32″N 18°27′53″E
- Country: Poland
- Voivodeship: Pomeranian
- County: Puck
- Gmina: Kosakowo
- Population: 888

Suchy Dwór [ˈsuxɨ ˈdvur] is a village in the administrative district of Gmina Kosakowo, within Puck County, Pomeranian Voivodeship, in northern Poland.

For details of the history of the region, see History of Pomerania.
