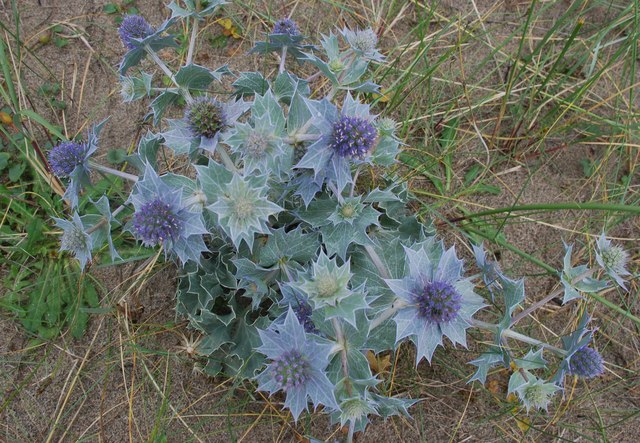

Conservation status
- Least Concern (IUCN 3.1) (Europe regional assessment)

Scientific classification
- Kingdom: Plantae
- Clade: Tracheophytes
- Clade: Angiosperms
- Clade: Eudicots
- Clade: Asterids
- Order: Apiales
- Family: Apiaceae
- Genus: Eryngium
- Species: E. maritimum

Binomial name
- Eryngium maritimum L.

= Eryngium maritimum =

Species of flowering plant

Eryngium maritimum, also called the sea holly, sea eryngo, or sea eryngium, is a perennial species of flowering plant in the carrot family Apiaceae, native to the coasts of most of Europe and the Mediterranean. Its prickly holly-like leaves and compact flower heads give it the appearance of a thistle. Despite its common name, it is not a holly but an umbellifer.

== Etymology ==
E. maritimum was formally described by Linnaeus in his Species Plantarum I: 233 (1753).

Eryngium, the genus name, may have arisen from a description of the plant by the Ancient Greek Theophrastus (c. 300 BC), who referred to it as "Eryngion", meaning a spiny plant. Alternatively, the name may have come from the Greek word "eruggarein", meaning to eructate (belch), since the plant was used to treat various digestive disorders such as trapped gases. The specific epithet maritimum means "of the sea".

The common English name appears to date from the 16th century. The naturalist William Turner stated In his 1548 publication The Names of Herbes that "Eryngium is named in englishe sea Hulver or sea Holly".

== Description ==
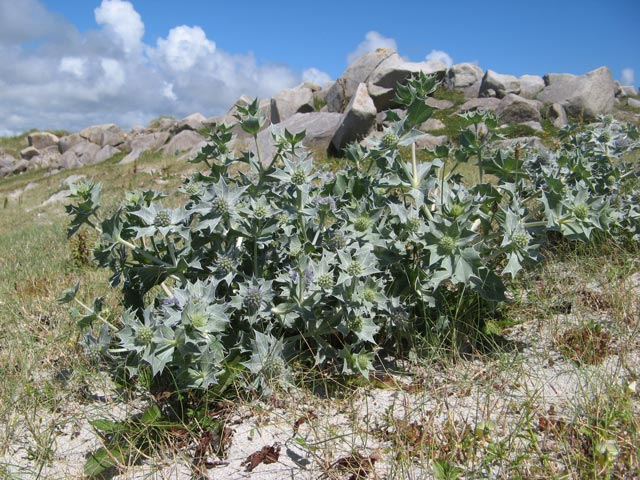
Sea holly at a beach in County Galway, Ireland

Sea holly is a bluish-grey, succulent, clumped perennial to 50+ cm, entirely hairless, with sizeable, wavy, stiff, spiny leaves. It is adapted to the dry (xerophytic) with a deep, well-developed root system and waxy leaf cuticle. The lowest leaves (5–15 cm, with. stalk) are rolled when young, and are palmately 3(5)-lobed with roundish outline and truncate or cordate base, thick margins, often with purplish veins, and stomata on both sides. The stem leaves are similar but smaller and stalkless. The stalks are channelled and dilated at the base. The cotyledons abruptly contract into a petiole.

The flowers are bluish white, 8 mm across, in 1.5–2.5 cm heads The whorl of leaves under the heads (bracts) are spiny and leaf-like, and the small bracteoles among the flowers are 3-spined. The sepals, 4–5 mm, are longer than the petals.

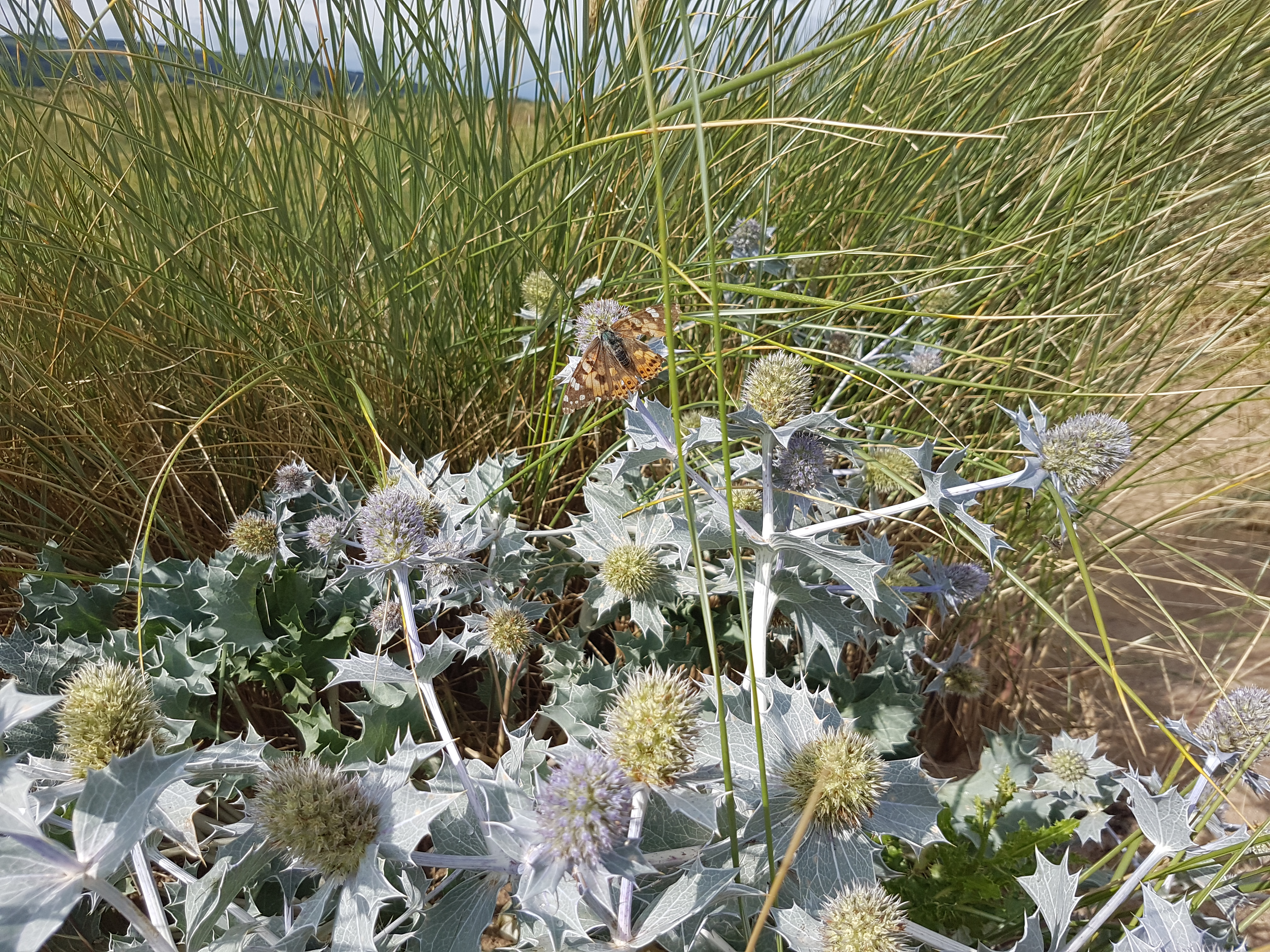
Sea Holly in Talacre, Wales.

It flowers June to September, and the flowers are attractive to butterflies.

The fruit, 13–15 mm, is more or less uncompressed and covered in stigmatic papillae which become longer towards the apex. The styles are about 6 mm long, divergent to somewhat recurved.

Its chromosome number is 2n = 16.

== Identification ==
Apart from its specific coastal habitat in sand or sometimes shingle, sea holly is recognisable by the bluish-grey holly-like spiny leaves.

== Hybrids ==
Although hybrids of E. maritimum have been reported, they are relatively few. For example, records have been made of a hybrid between E. maritimum and E. campestre (=Eryngium x rocheri Corb. ex Guétrot) in France, and in the region of Valencia, Spain.

== Distribution ==
The species is found along the coasts of most of Europe and the Mediterranean.

It is found along the coasts of England, Wales, and Ireland, however, it has largely become rare to extinct from the coasts of northeast England and much of Scotland. Nevertheless, it may have once been more common and widespread there. It was formerly extant in Shetland, but it never properly established itself at the northernmost limit of its native range. The last documented occurrence in Shetland was at Fitful Head in 1884, where the plant is presumed to have been widespread on the sands of the Bay of Quendale.

In Europe and adjacent parts of northern Africa and the Middle East, the plant has a wide native distribution. In these regions, it occurs on the shores of the Atlantic Ocean, the Baltic and Mediterranean Seas as well as the Black and Azov Seas. The distribution also extends northwards into Denmark, Germany, Poland, Lithuania, Latvia, and Estonia, along the Skagerrak and the Swedish islands of Gotland and Öland. The Scandinavian distribution is relatively southerly, extending only as far north as southern Norway and Sweden.

Sea holly has been introduced to parts of eastern North America, where it was once valued as an ornamental plant for coastal restoration. It has also been introduced to Australia with the planting of marram grass.

== Habitat and ecology ==
Sea holly grows characteristically on the well-drained substrates of sand dunes and shingles, and is restricted to regions with mild winters. More rarely, it can be found growing on rocky coasts with patches of sand interspersed between artificial hard coastal protection features with a similar structure to shingle. In northern Britain, its distribution is limited by the lack of suitable dune systems on which to grow. It withstands the harsh environmental conditions typical of beaches and coastal dune habitats worldwide; namely low soil nutrient levels, frost, strong salty winds, high temperatures and insolation, and periodic sand burial.

Sea holly is associated with various shingle and strandline communities, where it may be scattered within the vegetation. On shingles, sea holly occurs within Honckenya peploides-Cakile maritima strandline community above the tidal limit On dunes, sea holly may be found growing in the Elymus farctus ssp. boreali-atlanticus foredune community, the pioneer vegetation on foredunes, with Elytrigia juncea (E. farctus) as a dominant species.

Sea holly is a poor ecological competitor that generally thrives in open areas, declining when habitats are invaded by shrubby species such as Rosa rugosa, Hippophae rhamnoides, Elaeagnus commutata and Salix repens due to substantial shading effects This is because sea holly is a light-demanding plant, although it is protected against water stress through excessive insolation thanks to its succulent equifacial leaves.

Sea holly has deep, well-developed taproots for water storage, allowing the plant to survive long dry periods that may occur in its habitat. The root system also shows a high degree of plasticity in response to the dynamics of coastal ecosystems and may consequently develop a rhizome-like structure. For example, in response to permanent sand burial, the root internodes gradually lengthen in such a way that the perennating buds are brought closer to the ground surface for ensuring the plants' survival throughout the growing seasons.

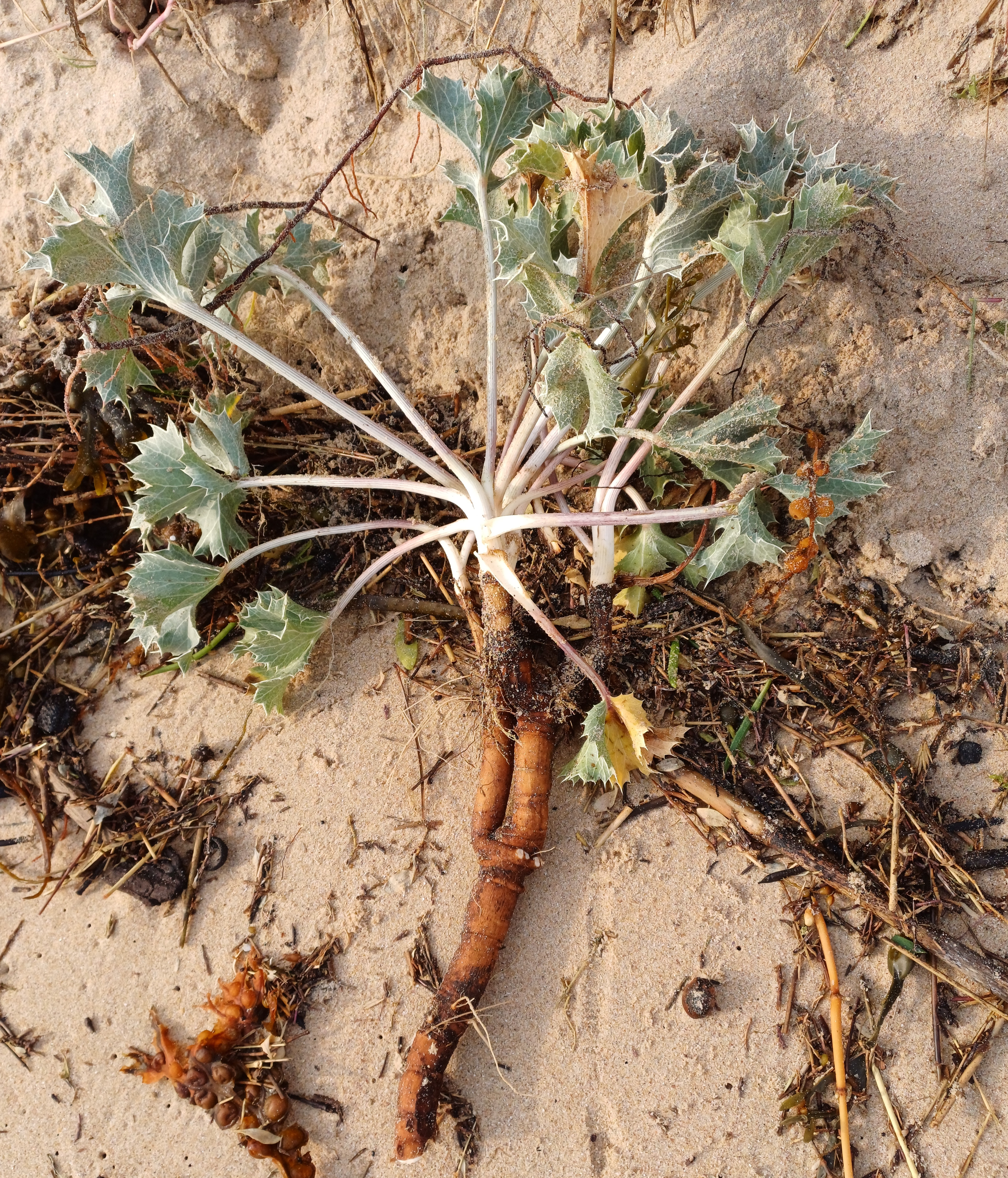
A sea holly plant on a sandy beach, uprooted by a storm.

== Status ==
Despite a widespread native European distribution, populations of this species have declined significantly in the northern parts of its range, with some of these already having become extinct. It is now threatened or endangered in most European countries and included in endangered plant lists and Red Data Books of several of these countries In Britain, its historic decline may be at least partly attributable to being dug up from the wild on account of its popularity as an ornamental plant in gardens on dry soils.

== In culture, use and relationship with humans ==
Like other species in the genus, E. maritimum has been traditionally consumed to combat various ailments, especially thanks to the plant's high antioxidant activity and content of phenolic and flavonoid compounds. It has been utilised for its diuretic, stimulant, cytotonic, stone inhibitor, aphrodisiac, expectorant and anthelmintic properties. Moreover, essential oils, extracted by hydro-distillation, from the aerial parts of the plant have been found to contain oxygenated sesquiterpenes with antimicrobial activity against E. coli and L. monocytogenes.

The roots of E. maritimum were formerly candied as a sweetmeat and recommended by Dioscorides as a remedy for flatulence. The young shoots may also be eaten like asparagus.

Sea holly has often been represented in paintings and other artwork, such as in works by Irish artist Patrick O'Hara and on postage stamp prints such as the 1967 one-franc stamp in Belgium, and the 25-pfennig stamp in Germany The plant has also been mentioned in various plays and poems, most notably in the Merry Wives of Windsor by Shakespeare and in the Italian Journey by Goethe.

They are named in a speech by Falstaff:

"Let the sky rain potatoes;
let it thunder to the tune of Green-sleeves,
hail kissing-comfits and snow eringoes [sea-holly],
let there come a tempest of provocation..."

— Falstaff, Act 5, scene v, "The Merry Wives of Windsor", William Shakespeare

Sea holly was nominated the 2002 County flower for the city of Liverpool. Asteroid 199194 Calcatreppola was named after this plant. The official naming citation was published by the Minor Planet Center on 25 September 2018 (M.P.C. 111803).

== Gallery ==
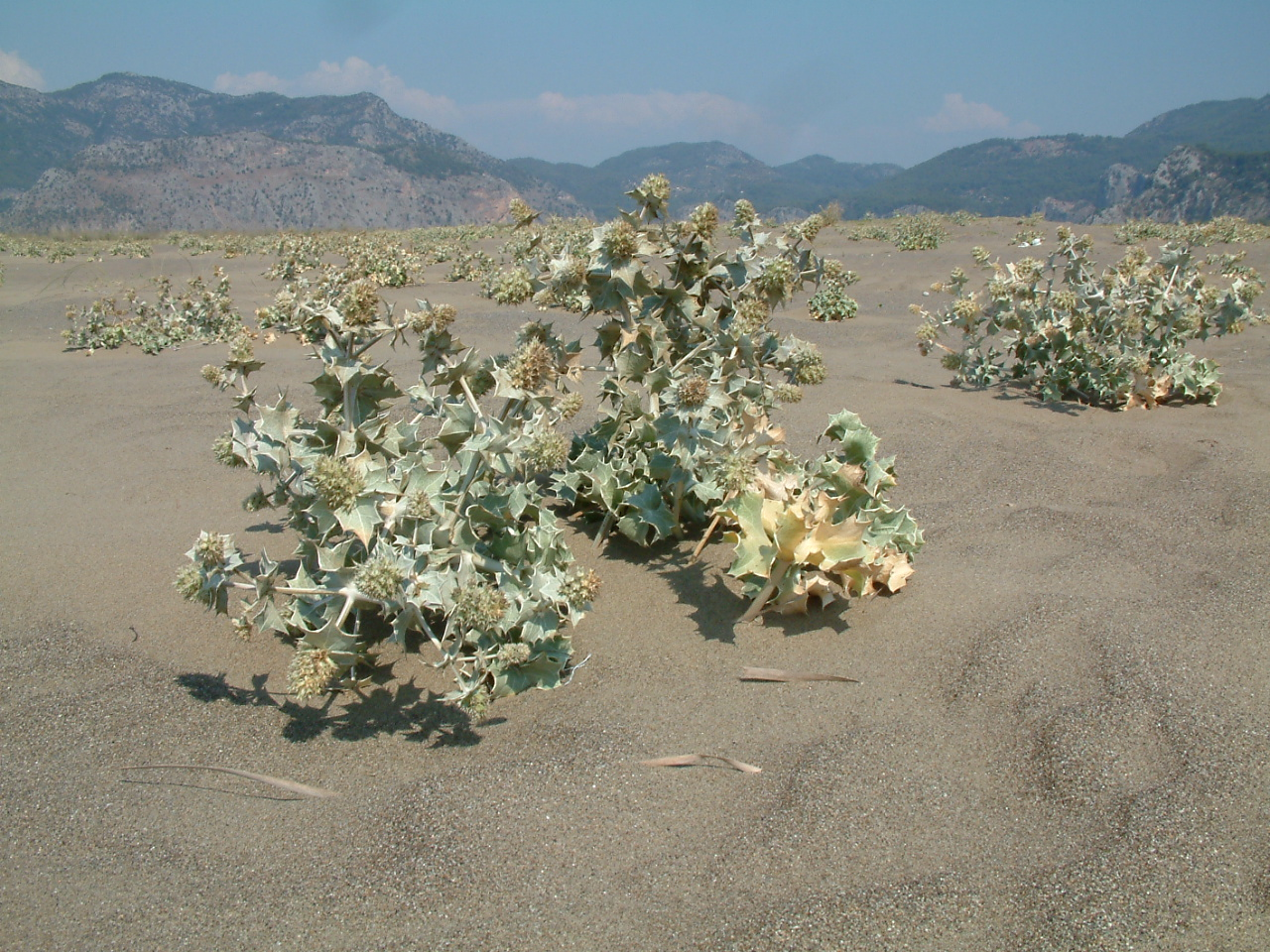
On the shore of the Mediterranean Sea near the mouth of Dalyan River, Turkey

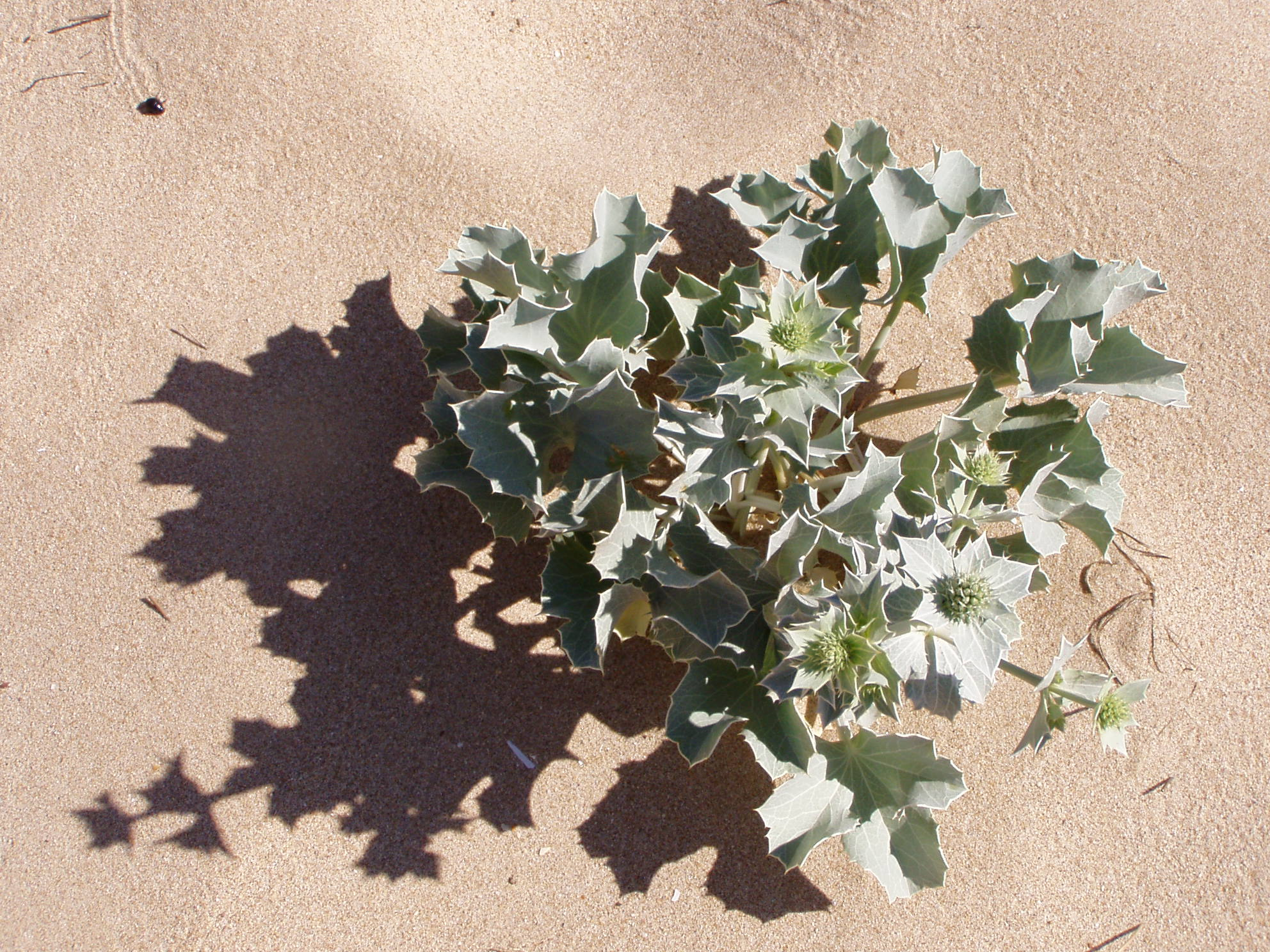
Whole plant, Meia Praia beach, Lagos, Portugal

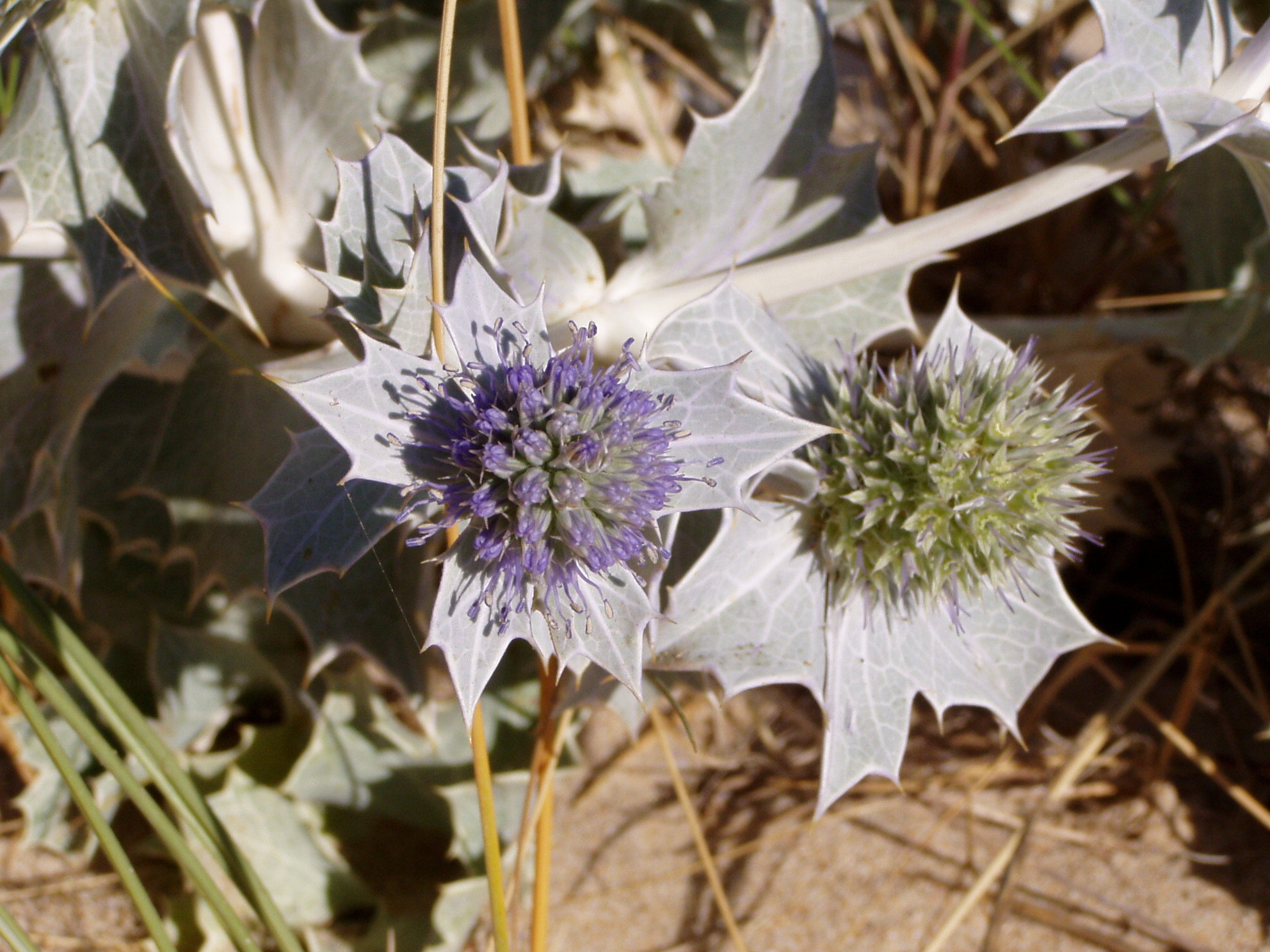
Flowers, Meia Praia beach, Lagos, Portugal

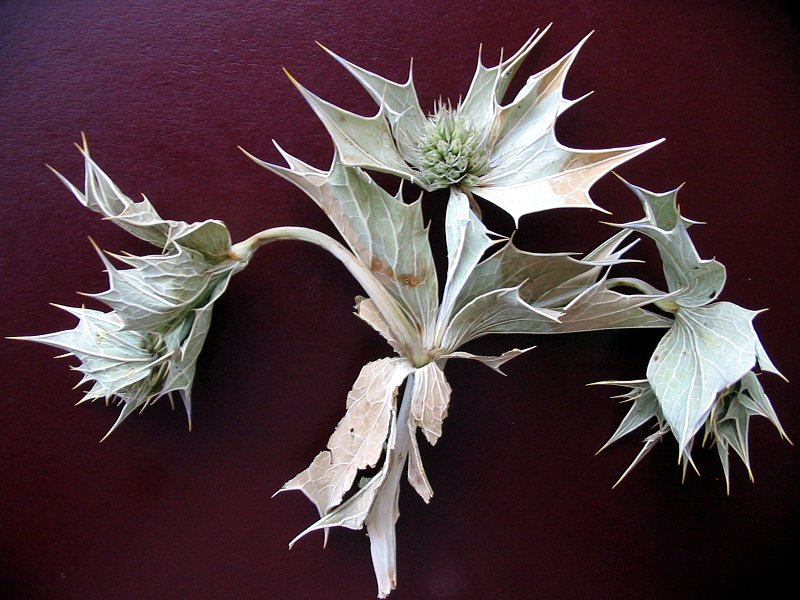
In Rewa, Poland

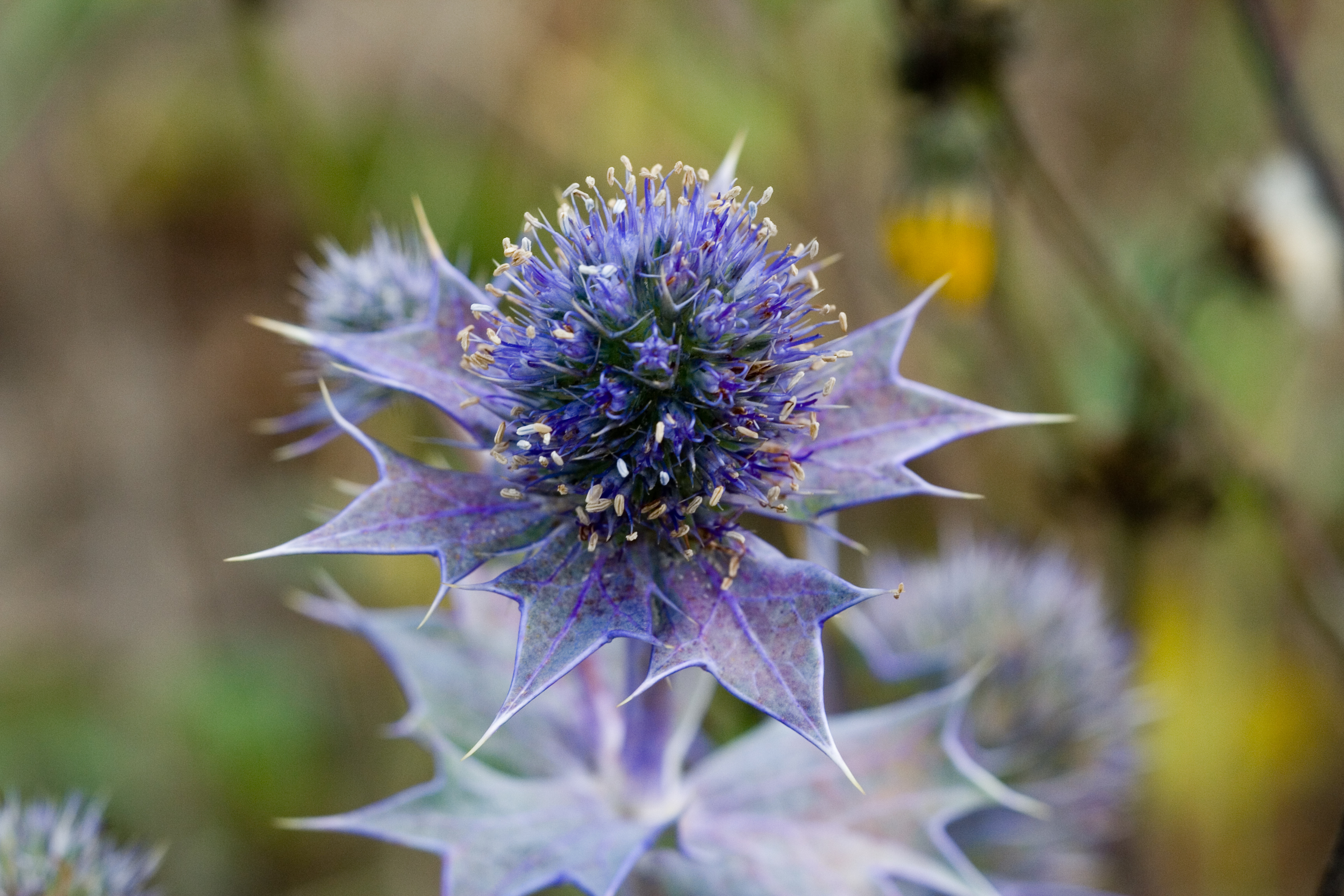
Close-up of inflorescence

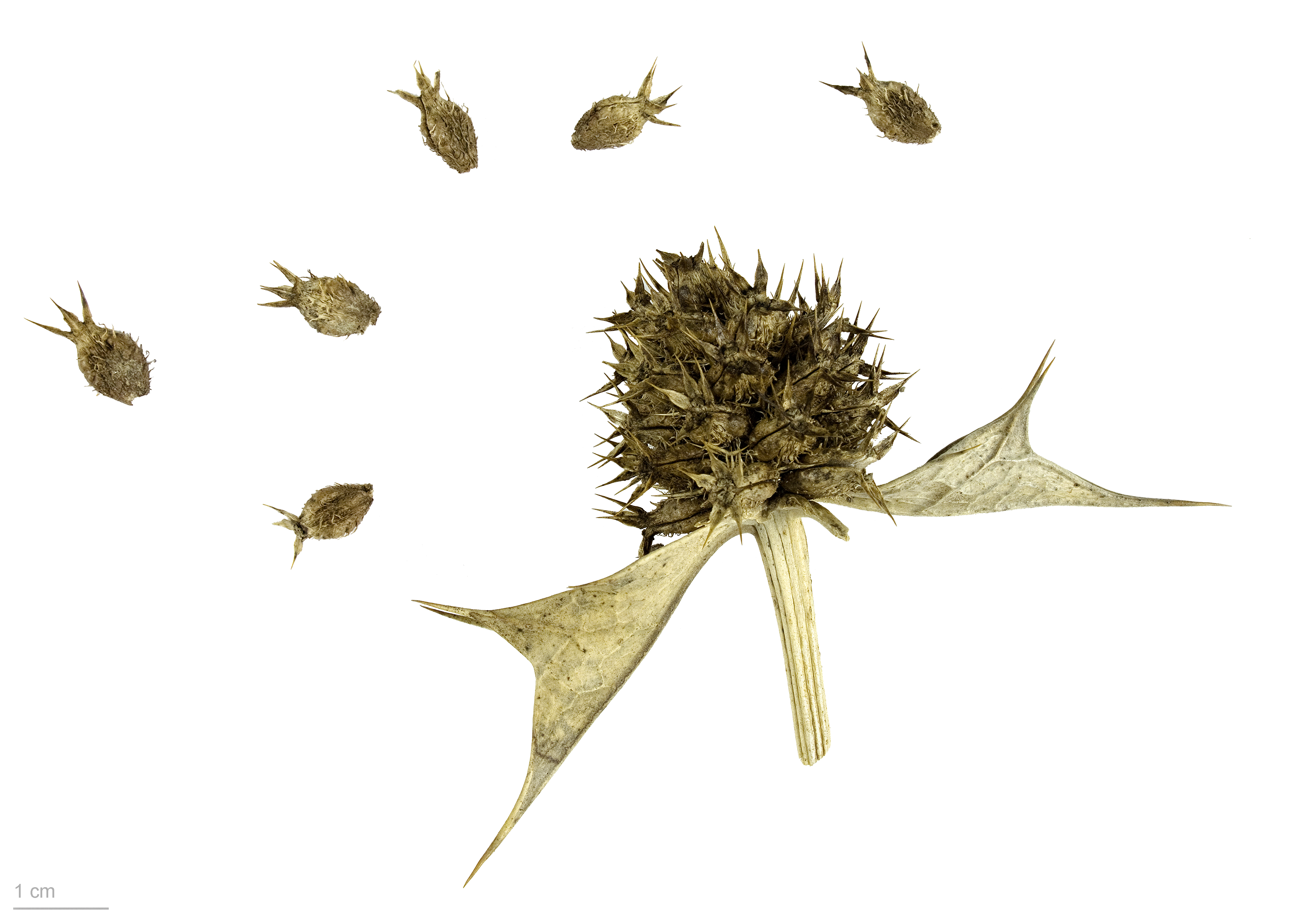
MHNT botanical specimen

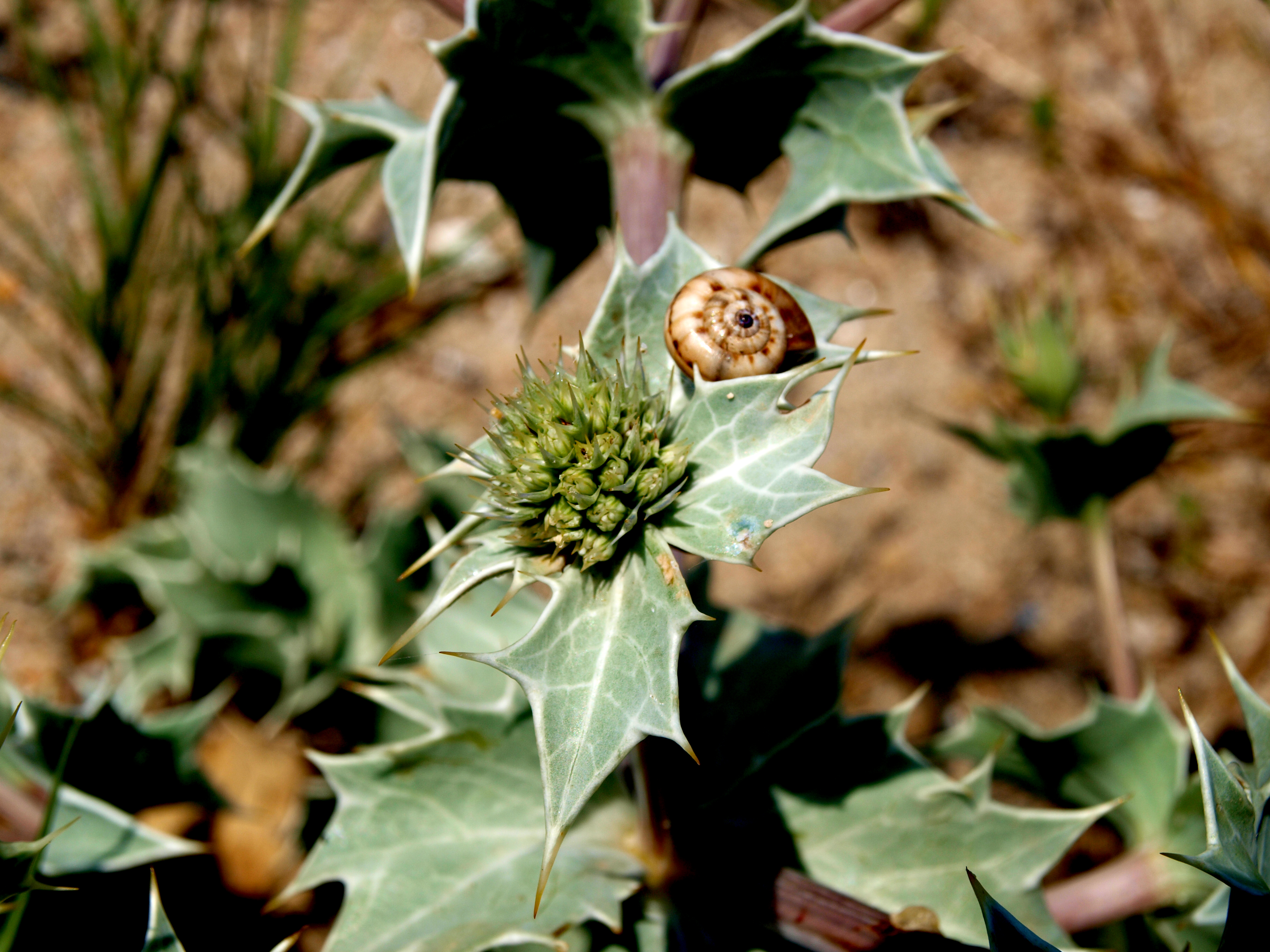
In Aggelohori, Greece

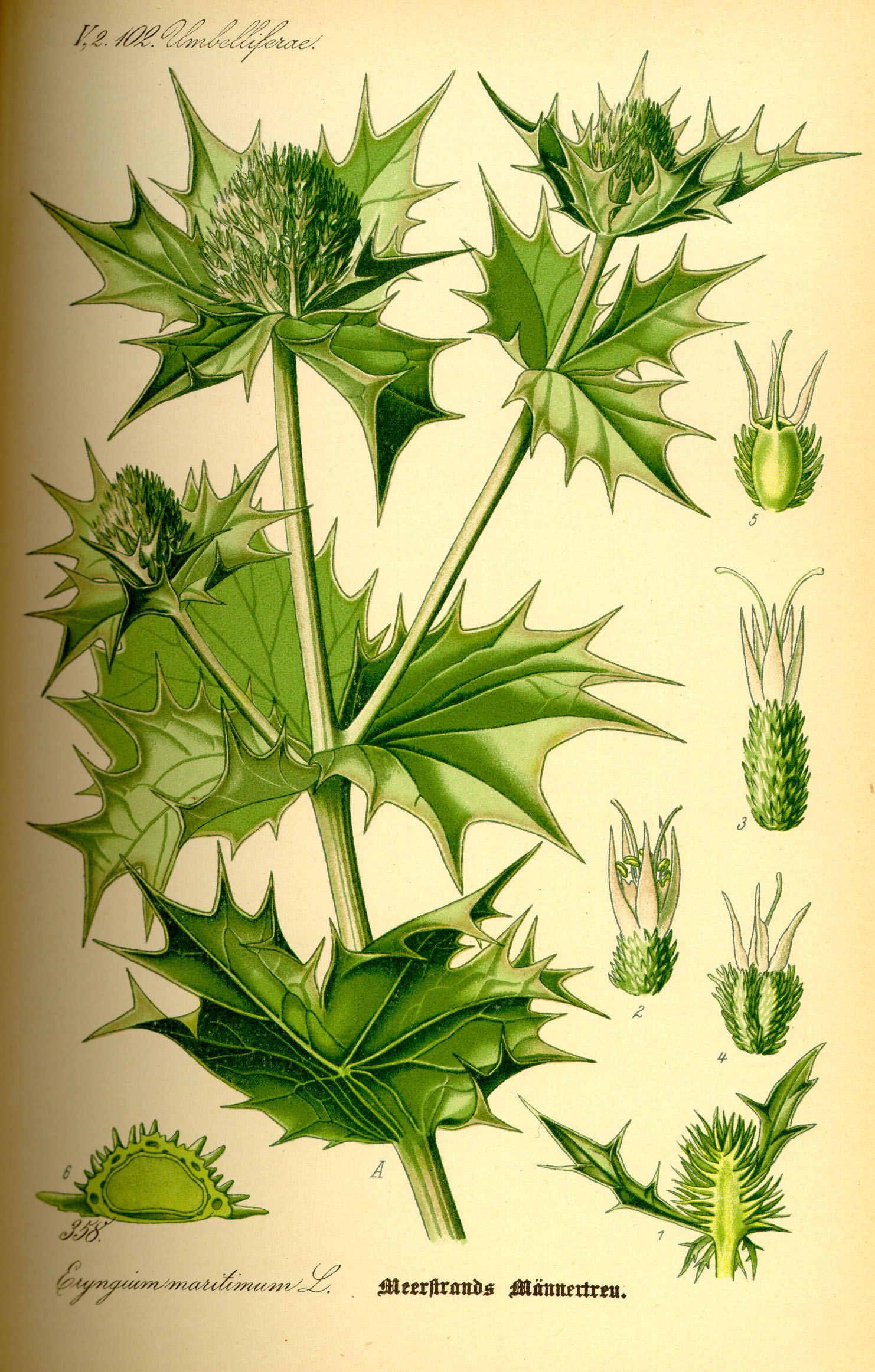
Illustration
