= Mechelinki =

- Village
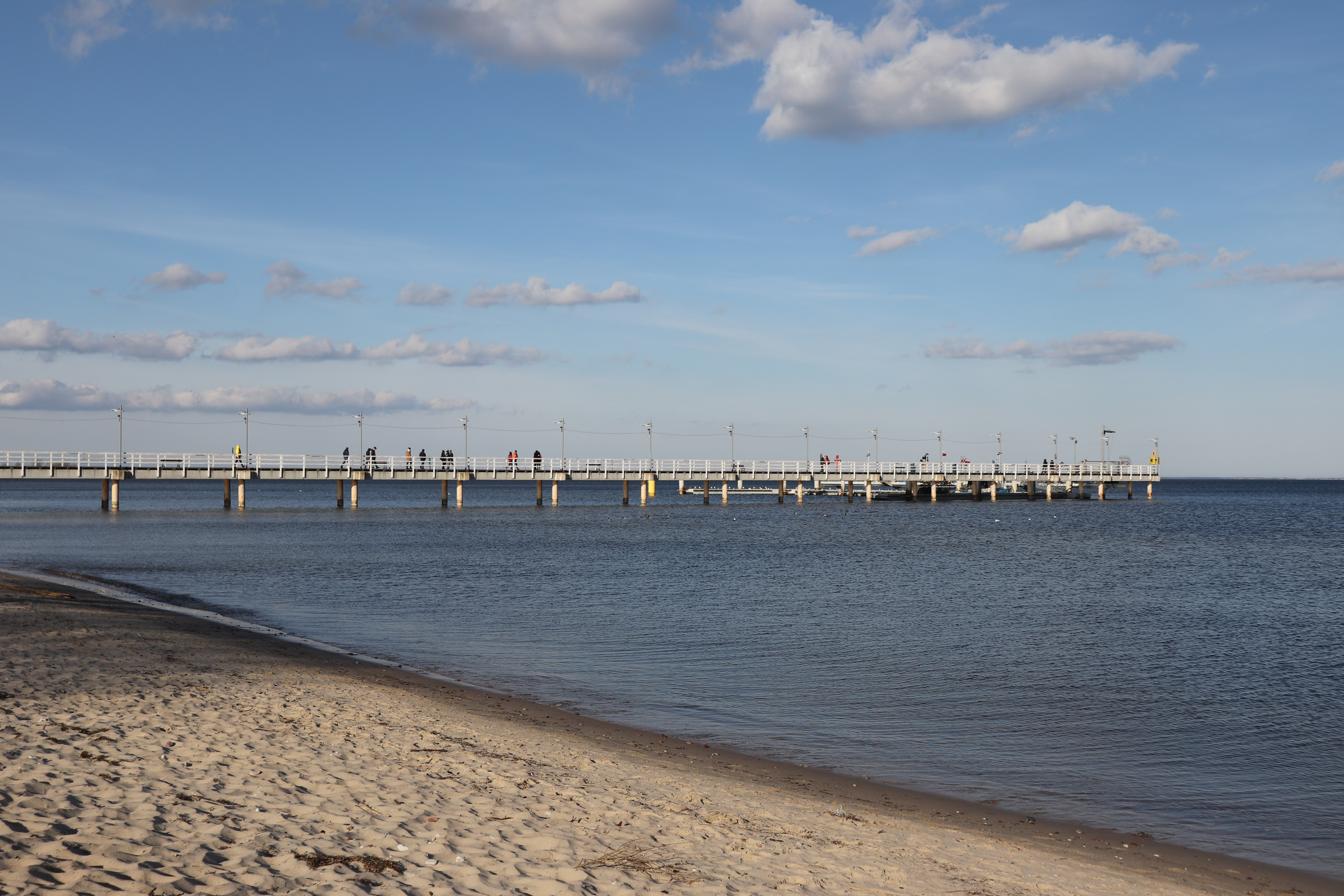
- Beach and pier in Mechelinki

- Location within Poland
- Coordinates: 54°36′32″N 18°30′44″E
- Country: Poland
- Voivodeship: Pomeranian
- County: Puck
- Gmina: Kosakowo
- Population: 303
- Time zone: UTC+1 (CET)
  - Summer (DST): UTC+2 (CEST)
- Vehicle registration: GPU
- Website: mechelinki.pl

Mechelinki [mɛxɛˈlinki] is a village in the administrative district of Gmina Kosakowo, within Puck County, Pomeranian Voivodeship, in northern Poland. It is located on the Bay of Puck on the coast of the Baltic Sea in the historic region of Pomerania.
