= Pierwoszyńskie Pustki =

- Settlement
- Location within Poland
- Coordinates: 54°35′28″N 18°30′7″E
- Country: Poland
- Voivodeship: Pomeranian
- County: Puck
- Gmina: Kosakowo
- Population: 0

Pierwoszyńskie Pustki [pjɛrvɔˈʂɨɲskʲɛ ˈpustki] is a former settlement in the administrative district of Gmina Kosakowo, within Puck County, Pomeranian Voivodeship, in northern Poland.

For details of the history of the region, see History of Pomerania.
