= Zaklęty Zamek =

- Village
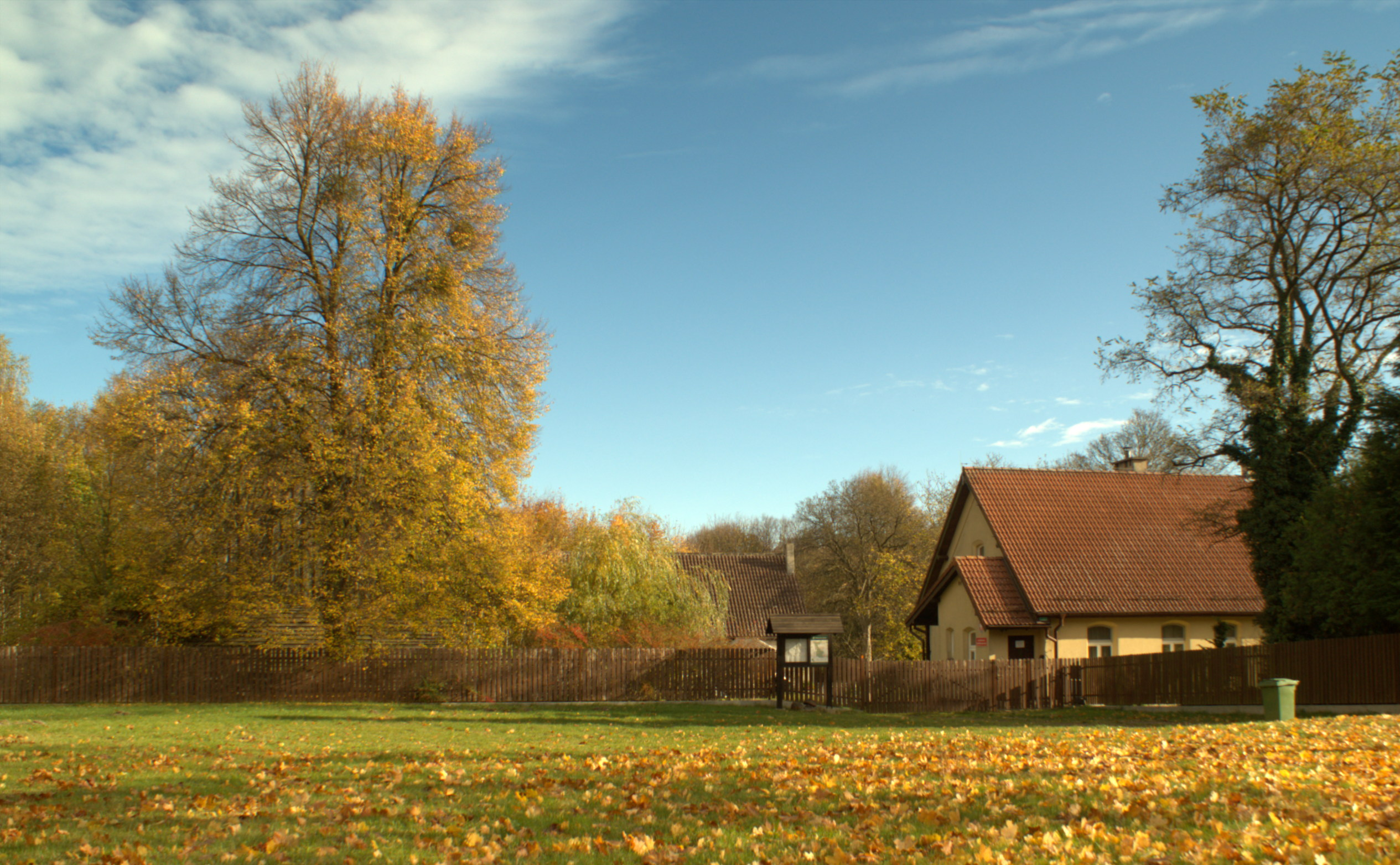

- Location within Poland
- Coordinates: 54°35′56″N 18°26′32″E
- Country: Poland
- Voivodeship: Pomeranian
- County: Puck
- Gmina: Kosakowo

Zaklęty Zamek [zaˈklɛntɨ ˈzamɛk] is a village in the administrative district of Gmina Kosakowo, within Puck County, Pomeranian Voivodeship, in northern Poland.

For details of the history of the region, see History of Pomerania.
