= Stefanowo, Puck County =

Stefanowo
- Settlement
- Location within Poland
- Coordinates: 54°35′8″N 18°31′8″E
- Country: Poland
- Voivodeship: Pomeranian
- County: Puck
- Gmina: Kosakowo

Stefanowo [stɛfaˈnɔvɔ] is a settlement in the administrative district of Gmina Kosakowo, within Puck County, Pomeranian Voivodeship, in northern Poland.

For details of the history of the region, see History of Pomerania.
