= Kazimierz, Pomeranian Voivodeship =

Kazimierz Kadzëmiérz (Kashubian)
- Village
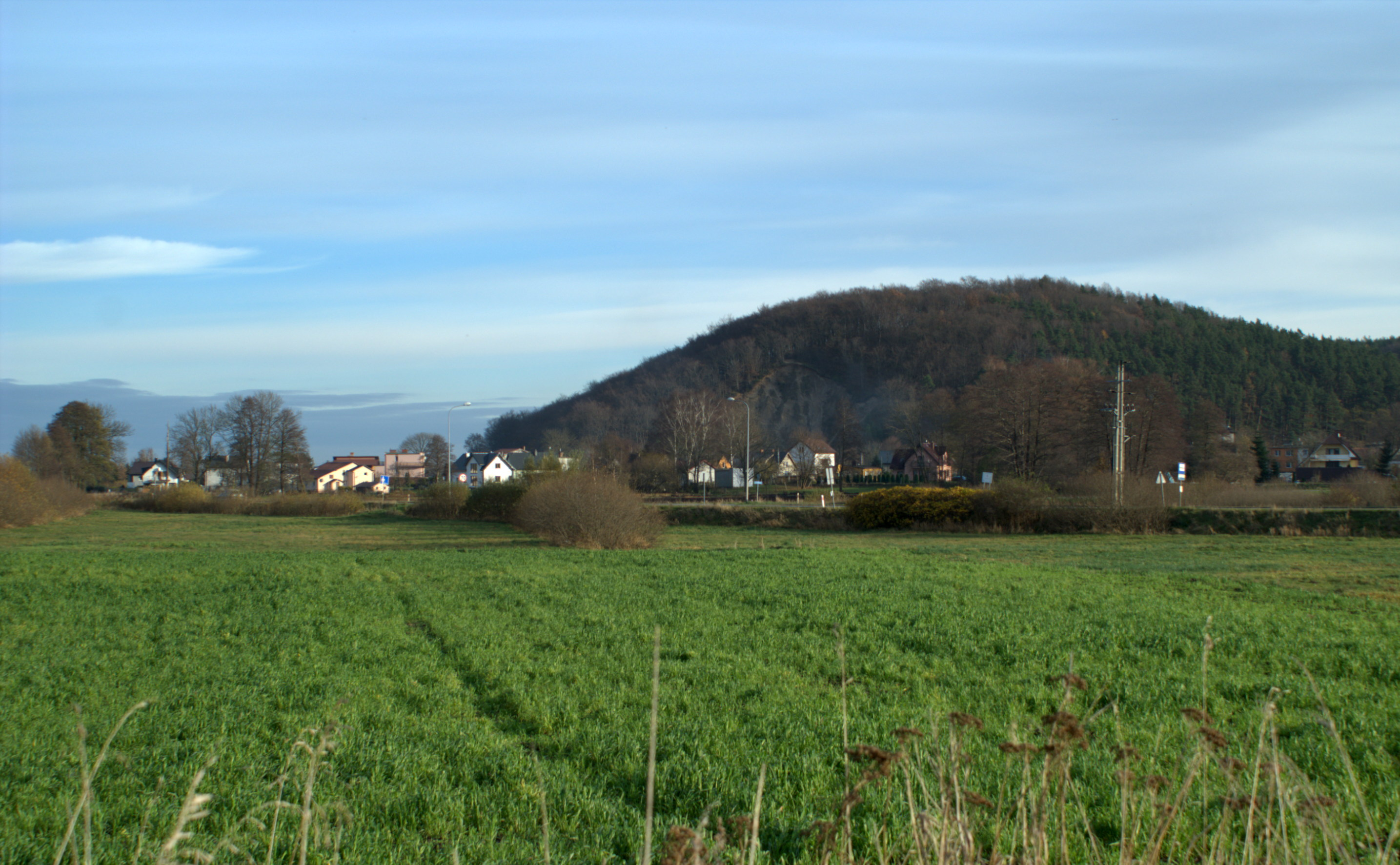

- Location within Poland
- Coordinates: 54°36′14″N 18°25′19″E
- Country: Poland
- Voivodeship: Pomeranian
- County: Puck
- Gmina: Kosakowo
- Population: 350

Kazimierz (Polish: [kaˈʑimjɛʂ]) is a village in the administrative district of Gmina Kosakowo, within Puck County, Pomeranian Voivodeship, in northern Poland.

For details of the history of the region, see History of Pomerania.
