= Voivodeship road 102 =

Road in Poland

Voivodeship Road 102
- Droga wojewódzka nr 102

Route information
- Maintained by Zachodnio Pomorski Zarząd Dróg Wojewódzkich
- Length: 94.736 km (58.866 mi)

Major junctions
- From: Misdroy
- To: Kołobrzeg

Location
- Country: Poland
- Regions: West Pomeranian Voivodeship

Highway system
- National roads in Poland; Voivodeship roads
← DW 101	→ DW 103

Voivodeship Road 102 (Polish: Droga wojewódzka nr 102, abbreviated DW 102) is a route in the Polish voivodeship roads network. It runs through the north of the West Pomeranian Voivodeship leading from Misdroy, and into Kołobrzeg where it meets the National Road 11 and Voivodeship Road 163.

== Major cities and towns along the route ==
- Misdroy
- Wisełka
- Międzywodzie
- Dziwnów
- Dziwnówek
- Pobierowo
- Rewal
- Lędzin
- Trzebiatów
- Kołobrzeg
