= Pogórze, Pomeranian Voivodeship =

Pogórze
- Village
- Location within Poland
- Coordinates: 54°33′55″N 18°28′41″E
- Country: Poland
- Voivodeship: Pomeranian
- County: Puck
- Gmina: Kosakowo
- Population: 1,123
- Website: http://www.wiespogorze.pl/

Pogórze [pɔˈɡuʐɛ] is a village in the administrative district of Gmina Kosakowo, within Puck County, Pomeranian Voivodeship, in northern Poland.

For details of the history of the region, see History of Pomerania.
