= Coastal Landscape Park =

Protected area in Poland

Coordinates: 54°39′02″N 18°28′06″E

- Nadmorski Park Krajobrazowy
- IUCN category V (protected landscape/seascape)
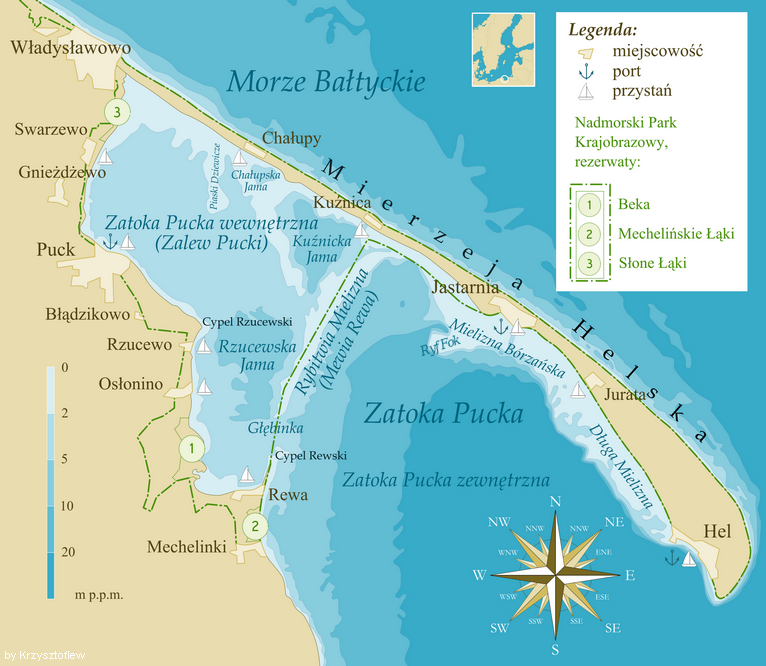
- Interactive map of Coastal Landscape Park
- Location: Pomeranian Voivodeship
- Area: 188 km^{2} (73 sq mi)
- Established: 1978

The Polish Coastal Landscape Park (Polish: Nadmorski Park Krajobrazowy; Kashubian: Nadmòrsczi Park Krajòbrazny) is a protected area (Landscape Park) in northern Poland, established in 1978, covering an area of 188 square kilometres (73 sq mi).

The Park lies within Pomeranian Voivodeship, in Puck County (Gmina Kosakowo, Gmina Krokowa, Gmina Puck).

Within the Landscape Park are nine nature reserves.

In the Coastal Landscape Park there are all types of coast typical of the southern Baltic Sea. A characteristic element here are bogs, including the easternmost, Atlantic-type raised bogs. Almost half of the park is covered with forests, especially pine trees. There is a beech reserve on Cape Rozewie.

The fauna includes birds such as gulls, buzzards, ruffs. The coastal waters are rich in algae, crustaceans and molluscs. There are also many species of fish: stickleback, roach, perch, eel. Puck Bay is a reservoir for grey seals. It can also be seen in the Seal Sanctuary in Hel.
