= Rewa, Poland =

Rewa
- Village
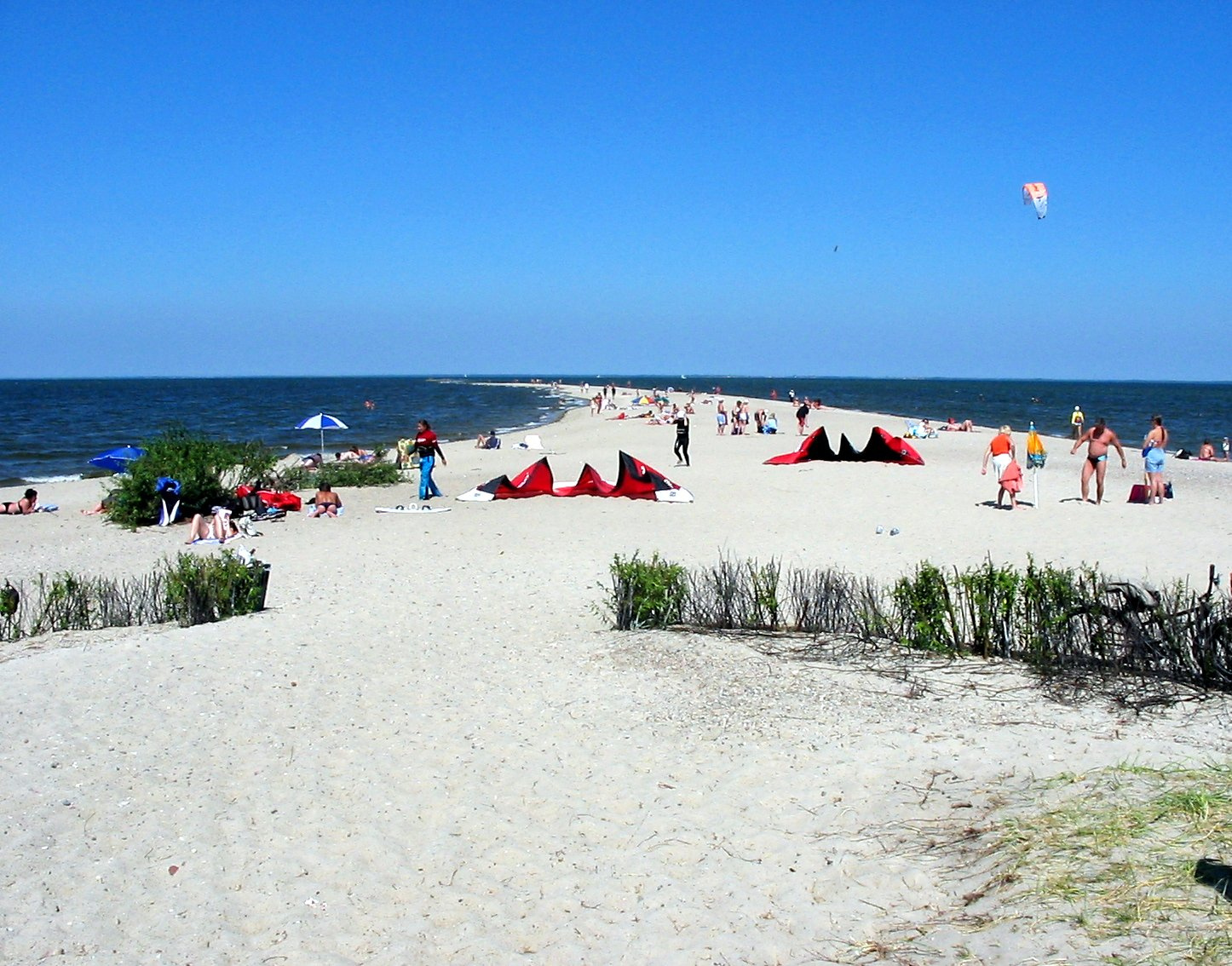
- Rewa sandbar

- Location within Poland
- Coordinates: 54°37′58″N 18°30′37″E
- Country: Poland
- Voivodeship: Pomeranian
- County: Puck
- Gmina: Kosakowo
- Population: 905
- Website: www.rewa.wpt.pl

Rewa [ˈrɛva] is a village in the administrative district of Gmina Kosakowo, within Puck County, Pomeranian Voivodeship, in northern Poland.

It is located on the eponymous shoal on the Puck Bay, an inlet of the Baltic Sea, and has a number of sandy beaches which attract tourists. The area is a centre for windsurfing and kitesurfing. The nearby marshes are a nature reserve and attract many wetland birds.
