= Mosty, Puck County =

Mosty
- Village
- Location within Poland
- Coordinates: 54°36′29″N 18°29′46″E
- Country: Poland
- Voivodeship: Pomeranian
- County: Puck
- Gmina: Kosakowo
- Population: 1,830

Mosty [ˈmɔstɨ] is a village in the administrative district of Gmina Kosakowo, within Puck County, Pomeranian Voivodeship, in northern Poland.

For details of the history of the region, see History of Pomerania.
