= Pierwoszyno =

- Village
- Location within Poland
- Coordinates: 54°35′51″N 18°30′11″E
- Country: Poland
- Voivodeship: Pomeranian
- County: Puck
- Gmina: Kosakowo
- Population: 718

Pierwoszyno [pjɛrvɔˈʂɨnɔ] is a village in the administrative district of Gmina Kosakowo, within Puck County, Pomeranian Voivodeship, in northern Poland.

For details of the history of the region, see History of Pomerania.
