= Voivodeship road 100 =

Road in Poland

Voivodeship Road 100
- Droga wojewódzka nr 100

Route information
- Maintained by Zachodniopomorski Zarząd Dróg Wojewódzkich
- Existed: 2025–present

Major junctions
- From: DK 3 Łunowo (Świnoujście)
- To: DK 93 in Świnoujście

Location
- Country: Poland
- Regions: West Pomeranian Voivodeship
- Major cities: Świnoujście

Highway system
- National roads in Poland; Voivodeship roads

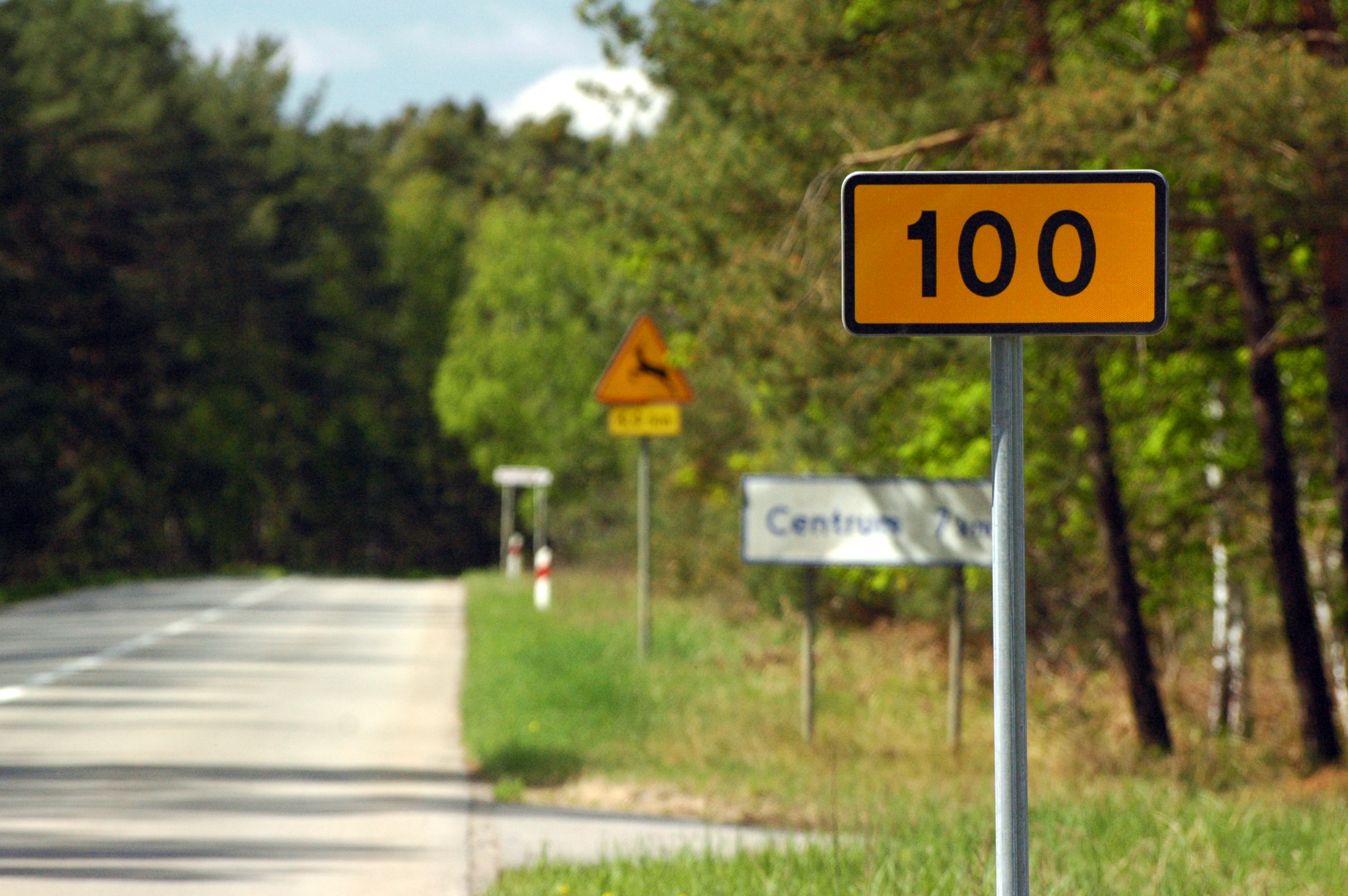
Road in 2025

Voivodeship Road 100 (Polish: Droga wojewódzka nr 100, abbreviated DW 100) is a former voivodeship road. It ran through the West Pomeranian Voivodeship leading in Świnoujście.

== Route plan ==
km	Icon	Name	Crossed roads
x		Łunowo	—
x		Świnoujście	
