= Kosakowo, Pomeranian Voivodeship =

Kosakowo
- Village
- Location within Poland
- Coordinates: 54°35′22″N 18°28′54″E
- Country: Poland
- Voivodeship: Pomeranian
- County: Puck
- Gmina: Kosakowo
- Population: around 1,500

Kosakowo [kɔsaˈkɔvɔ] is a village in Puck County, Pomeranian Voivodeship, in northern Poland. It is the seat of the gmina (administrative district) called Gmina Kosakowo.

For details of the history of the region, see History of Pomerania.

The village is the site of the Gdynia-Kosakowo Airport, serving the city of Gdynia.
