= Dębogórze =

- Village
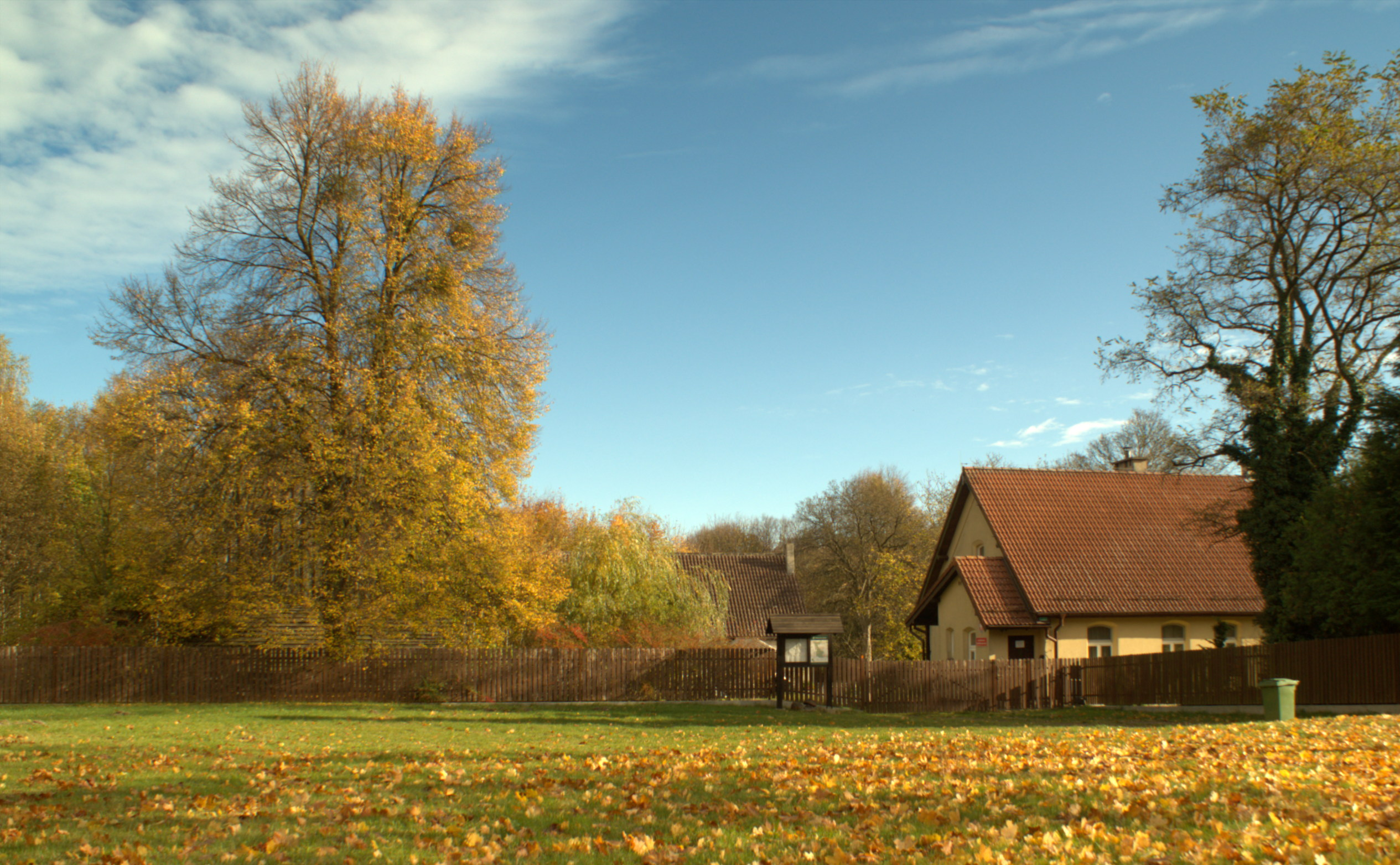

- Location within Poland
- Coordinates: 54°35′29″N 18°27′42″E
- Country: Poland
- Voivodeship: Pomeranian
- County: Puck
- Gmina: Kosakowo
- Population: 962

Dębogórze [dɛmbɔˈɡuʐɛ] is a village in the administrative district of Gmina Kosakowo, within Puck County, Pomeranian Voivodeship, in northern Poland.

For details of the history of the region, see History of Pomerania.

== Notable residents ==
- Jan Radtke (1872–1958), first voigt of Gdynia
- Heinrich von Tiedemann (1840–1922), German politician
