= Chylonia =

- District of Gdynia
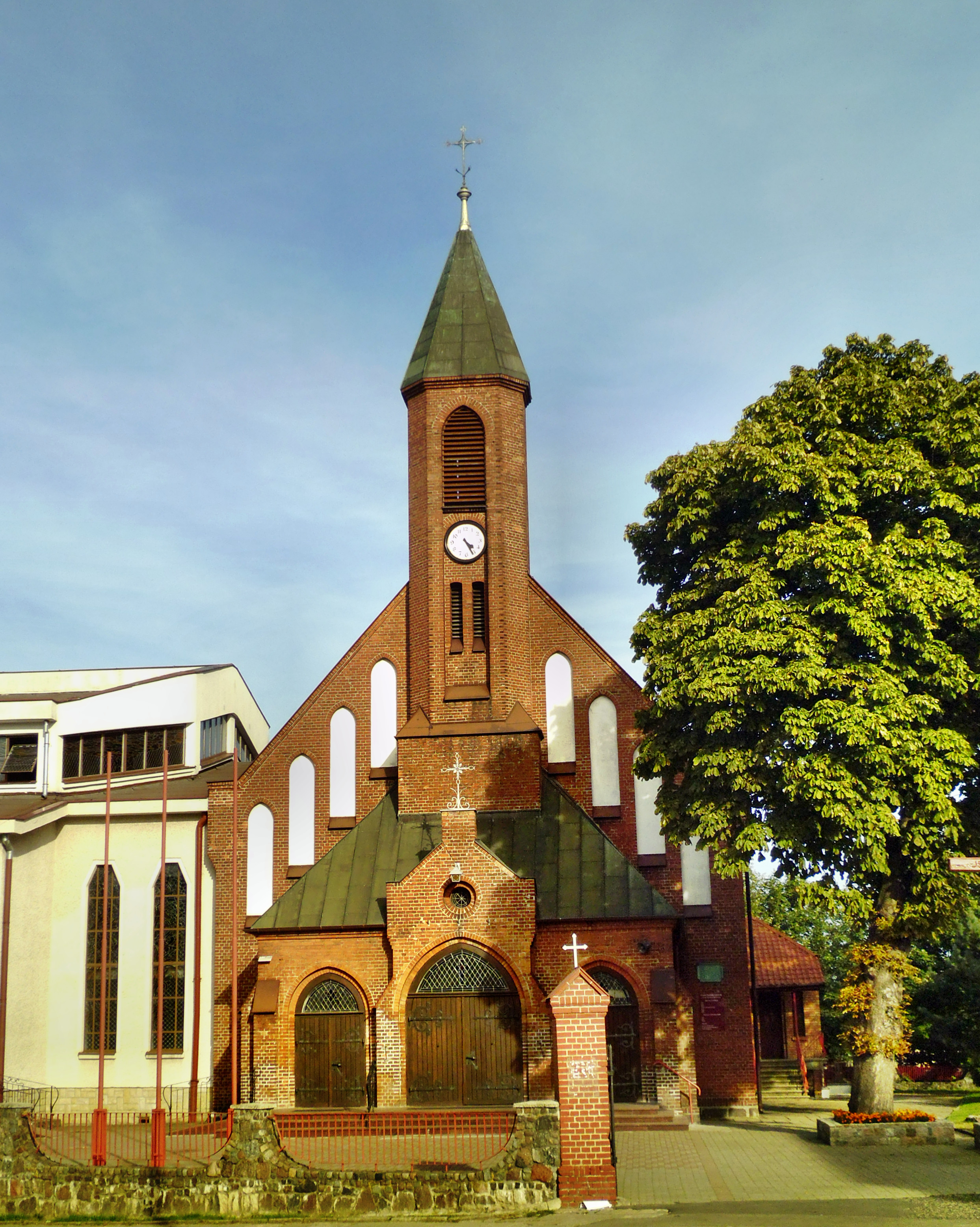
- Saint Nicholas church

- Coat of arms

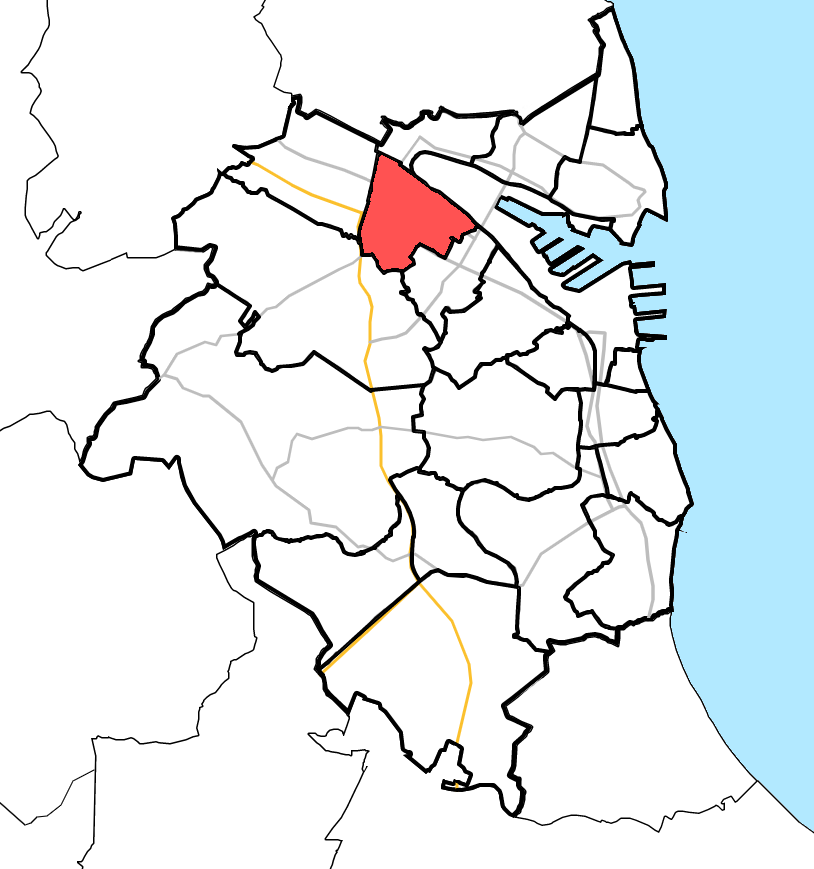
- Location of Chylonia within Gdynia
- Coordinates: 54°32′32″N 18°27′56″E
- Country: Poland
- Voivodeship: Pomeranian
- County/City: Gdynia
- Within city limits: 1930

Area
  - Total: 3.84 km^{2} (1.48 sq mi)

Population (2022)
  - Total: 20,450
  - Density: 5,330/km^{2} (13,800/sq mi)
- Time zone: UTC+1 (CET)
  - Summer (DST): UTC+2 (CEST)
- Vehicle registration: GA

Chylonia ([xɨlɔnia]; Kashubian: Chëlonô; German: Kielau) is a district of Gdynia, Poland, located in the northern part of the city.

== History ==
Chylonia was a royal village of the Kingdom of Poland, administratively located in the Puck County in the Pomeranian Voivodeship.

During the German occupation of Poland in World War II, in 1939, the occupiers operated a temporary transit camp for expelled Poles in Chylonia.

== Demographics ==
Historical population
Year	Pop.
1921	1,006
2022	20,450

== Transport ==
The Gdynia Chylonia and Gdynia Leszczynki railway stations are located in Chylonia.
