= Gdańsk Oliwa railway station =

Railway station in Gdańsk, Poland

Gdańsk Oliwa
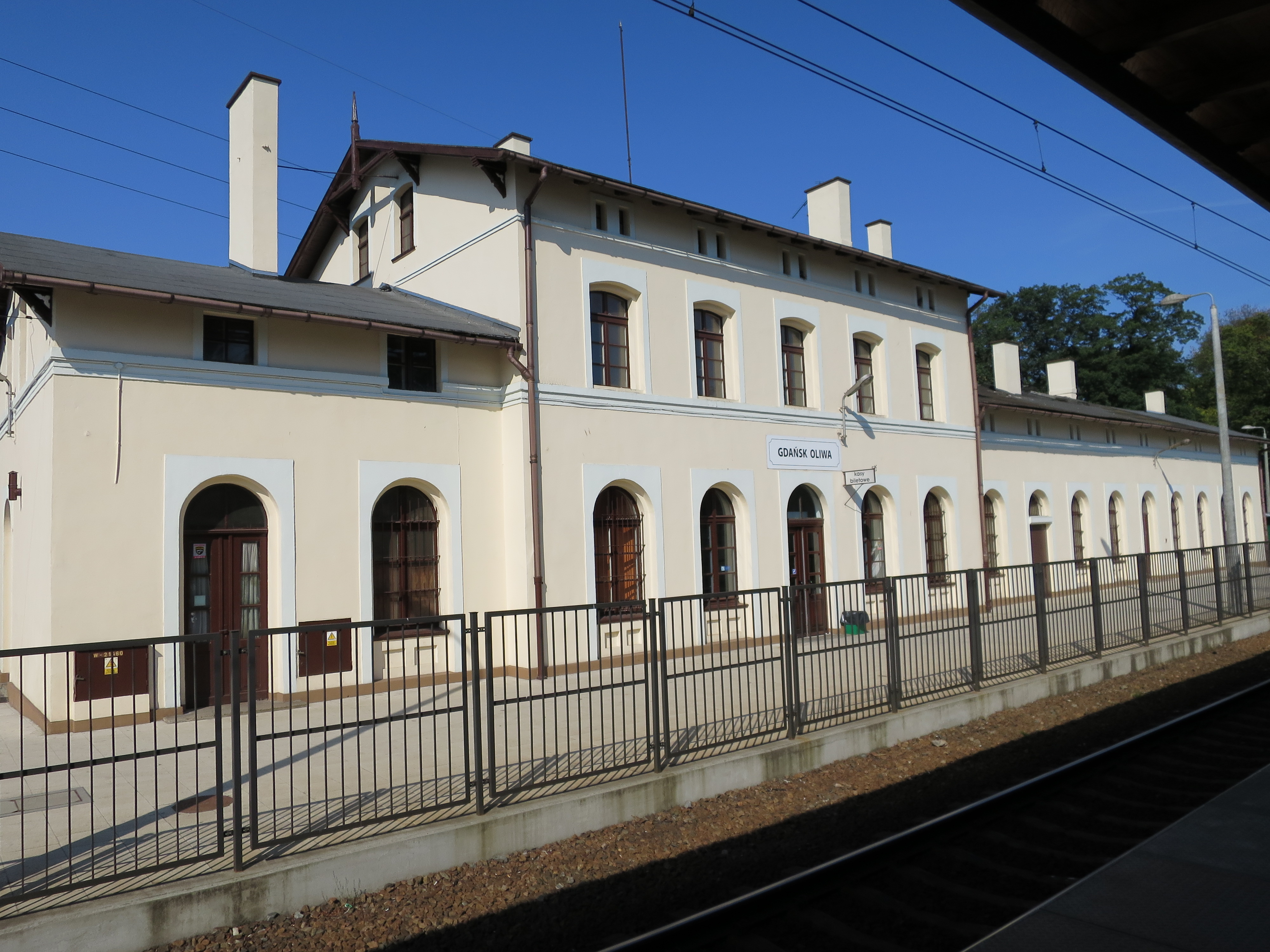
- Gdańsk Oliwa railway station

General information
- Location: Gdańsk, Pomeranian Voivodeship; Poland
- System: Railway Station
- Operator: PKP Polskie Linie Kolejowe; SKM Tricity
- Lines: 202: Gdańsk–Stargard railway 250: Gdańsk Śródmieście–Rumia railway
- Platforms: 4
- Tracks: 4

History
- Opened: 1 July 1870; 156 years ago
Location
- Location within Poland

Gdańsk Oliwa railway station is a railway station serving the city of Gdańsk, in the Pomeranian Voivodeship, Poland. The station opened in 1870 and is located on the Gdańsk–Stargard railway and the parallel Gdańsk Śródmieście–Rumia railway. The station is located in the Oliwa quarter of the city. The train services are operated by PKP, Polregio and SKM Tricity. Masovian Railways trains operate here during the summer.

== General information ==
The station was built and opened in 1870 as part of a new railway line from Szczecin to Gdansk. This was the third established railway line in Gdansk (the line Gdańsk-Tczew and the railway line No. 249 to the Port). At the time Oliwa was an independent municipality and had about 3,000 inhabitants. On 1 July 1926, Oliwa was incorporated in the administrative boundaries of the city and the station name was changed to Danzig Oliva.

On 2 January 1952 the SKM Trojmiasto suburban railway was opened, parallel to the existing line.

The station features two island platforms, of which one functions as the regional commuter SKM stop and the other for long-distance services. The platforms are accessible through an underpass of which connects all four platforms. The ticket offices are open all day long.

== Modernisation ==
In late 2008 the platforms of SKM underwent a complete renovation. They restored the historic shelter and pavement, lifts and electronic information boards showing the next departures.

In June 2011 a major renovation of the main line platforms started, this was completed in 2014.

== Train services ==
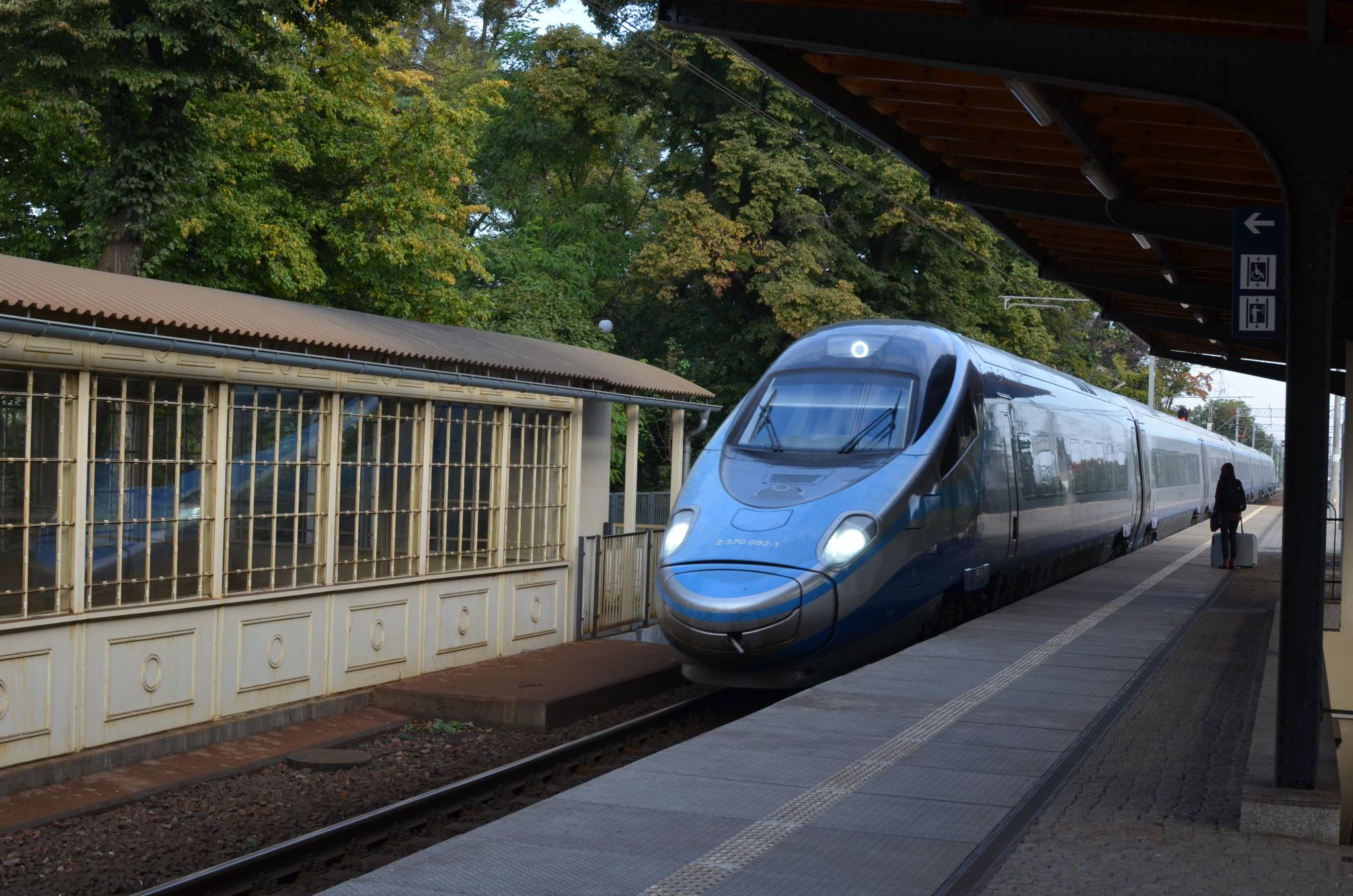
Express InterCity Premium at Gdańsk Oliwa

The station is served by the following services:

- EuroCity services (EC) (EC 95 by DB) (IC by PKP) Gdynia - Gdansk - Bydgoszcz - Poznan - Rzepin - Frankfurt (Oder) - Berlin
- EuroCity services (EC) Gdynia - Gdansk - Malbork - Warsaw - Katowice - Bohumin - Ostrava - Prerov - Breclav - Vienna
- Express Intercity Premium services (EIP) Gdynia - Warsaw
- Express Intercity Premium services (EIP) Gdynia - Warsaw - Katowice - Gliwice/Bielsko-Biała
- Express Intercity Premium services (EIP) Gdynia/Kołobrzeg - Warsaw - Kraków (- Rzeszów)
- Intercity services (IC) Gdynia - Gdansk - Bydgoszcz - Poznań - Wrocław - Opole - Katowice - Kraków - Rzeszów - Przemyśl
- Intercity services (IC) Gdynia - Gdańsk - Bydgoszcz - Toruń - Kutno - Łódź - Częstochowa - Katowice - Bielsko-Biała
- Intercity services (IC) Gdynia - Gdańsk - Bydgoszcz - Łódź - Czestochowa — Kraków — Zakopane
- Intercity services (IC) Gdynia - Gdańsk - Bydgoszcz - Poznań - Zielona Góra
- Intercity services (IC) Gdynia - Gdańsk - Bydgoszcz - Poznań - Wrocław
- Intercity services (IC) Łódź Fabryczna — Warsaw — Gdańsk Glowny — Kołobrzeg
- Intercity services (IC) Szczecin - Koszalin - Słupsk - Gdynia - Gdańsk
- Intercity services (IC) Szczecin - Koszalin - Słupsk - Gdynia - Gdańsk - Elbląg/Iława - Olsztyn
- Intercity services (IC) Szczecin - Koszalin - Słupsk - Gdynia - Gdańsk - Elbląg - Olsztyn - Białystok
- Intercity services (TLK) Gdynia Główna — Kostrzyn
- Intercity services (TLK) Gdynia Główna — Warsaw — Kraków — Zakopane
- Intercity services (TLK) Kołobrzeg — Gdynia Główna — Warszawa Wschodnia — Kraków Główny
- Regional services (R) Tczew — Gdynia Chylonia
- Regional services (R) Tczew — Słupsk
- Regional services (R) Malbork — Słupsk
- Regional services (R) Malbork — Gdynia Chylonia
- Regional services (R) Elbląg — Gdynia Chylonia
- Regional services (R) Elbląg — Słupsk
- Regional services (R) Chojnice — Tczew — Gdynia Główna
- Regional services (R) Gdynia Chylonia — Olsztyn Główny
- Regional services (R) Gdynia Chylonia — Smętowo
- Regional services (R) Gdynia Chylonia — Laskowice Pomorskie
- Regional services (R) Gdynia Chylonia — Bydgoszcz Główna
- Regional services (R) Słupsk — Bydgoszcz Główna
- Regional services (R) Gdynia Chylonia — Pruszcz Gdański
- Pomorska Kolej Metropolitalna services (R) Kościerzyna — Gdańsk Port Lotniczy (Airport) — Gdańsk Wrzeszcz — Gdynia Główna
- Szybka Kolej Miejska w Trójmieście services (SKMT) (Lębork -) Wejherowo - Reda - Rumia - Gdynia - Sopot - Gdansk

Preceding station	PKP Intercity	Following station
Sopot towards Gdynia Główna	EuroCity EC 95; IC	Gdańsk Wrzeszcz towards Berlin Hbf
Sopot towards Gdynia Główna	EuroCity IC	Gdańsk Wrzeszcz towards Wien Hbf
Sopot towards Gdynia Główna	EIP	Gdańsk Wrzeszcz towards Warszawa Centralna
Sopot towards Gdynia Główna	EIP	Gdańsk Wrzeszcz towards Gliwice or Bielsko-Biała Główna
Sopot towards Gdynia Główna or Kołobrzeg	EIP	Gdańsk Wrzeszcz towards Kraków Główny or Rzeszów Główny
Sopot towards Gdynia Główna	IC	Gdańsk Wrzeszcz towards Przemyśl Główny
Sopot towards Gdynia Główna	IC	Gdańsk Wrzeszcz towards Bielsko-Biała Główna
Sopot towards Gdynia Główna	IC (Via Bydgoszcz, Łódź)	Gdańsk Wrzeszcz towards Zakopane
Sopot towards Gdynia Główna	IC	Gdańsk Wrzeszcz towards Zielona Góra Główna
Sopot towards Gdynia Główna	IC	Gdańsk Wrzeszcz towards Wrocław Główny
Sopot towards Kołobrzeg	IC	Gdańsk Wrzeszcz towards Łódź Fabryczna
Sopot towards Szczecin Główny	IC	Gdańsk Wrzeszcz towards Gdańsk Główny
Sopot towards Szczecin Główny	IC	Gdańsk Wrzeszcz towards Olsztyn Główny
Sopot towards Szczecin Główny	IC	Gdańsk Wrzeszcz towards Białystok
Sopot towards Gdynia Główna	TLK	Gdańsk Wrzeszcz towards Kostrzyn
Sopot towards Gdynia Główna	TLK (Via Warsaw)	Gdańsk Wrzeszcz towards Zakopane
Sopot towards Kołobrzeg	TLK	Gdańsk Wrzeszcz towards Kraków Główny
Preceding station	Polregio	Following station
Sopot towards Gdynia Główna, Gdynia Chylonia or Słupsk	PR	Gdańsk Wrzeszcz towards Tczew
Sopot towards Gdynia Główna, Gdynia Chylonia or Słupsk	PR	Gdańsk Wrzeszcz towards Malbork
Sopot towards Gdynia Główna, Gdynia Chylonia or Słupsk	PR	Gdańsk Wrzeszcz towards Elbląg
Sopot towards Gdynia Główna	PR	Gdańsk Wrzeszcz towards Chojnice
Sopot towards Gdynia Chylonia	PR	Gdańsk Wrzeszcz towards Olsztyn Główny
Sopot towards Gdynia Główna, Gdynia Chylonia or Słupsk	PR	Gdańsk Wrzeszcz towards Smętowo, Laskowice Pomorskie, or Bydgoszcz Główna
Sopot towards Gdynia Chylonia	PR	Gdańsk Wrzeszcz towards Pruszcz Gdański
Gdańsk Wrzeszcz towards Kościerzyna	PR (Via Gdańsk Port Lotniczy (Airport) and Gdańsk Wrzeszcz)	Sopot towards Gdynia Główna
Preceding station	SKM Tricity	Following station
Gdańsk Żabianka towards Wejherowo or Lębork	SKM Tricity	Gdańsk Przymorze-Uniwersytet towards Gdańsk Śródmieście
