= Gdynia Orłowo railway station =

Railway station in Gdynia, Poland

Gdynia Orłowo
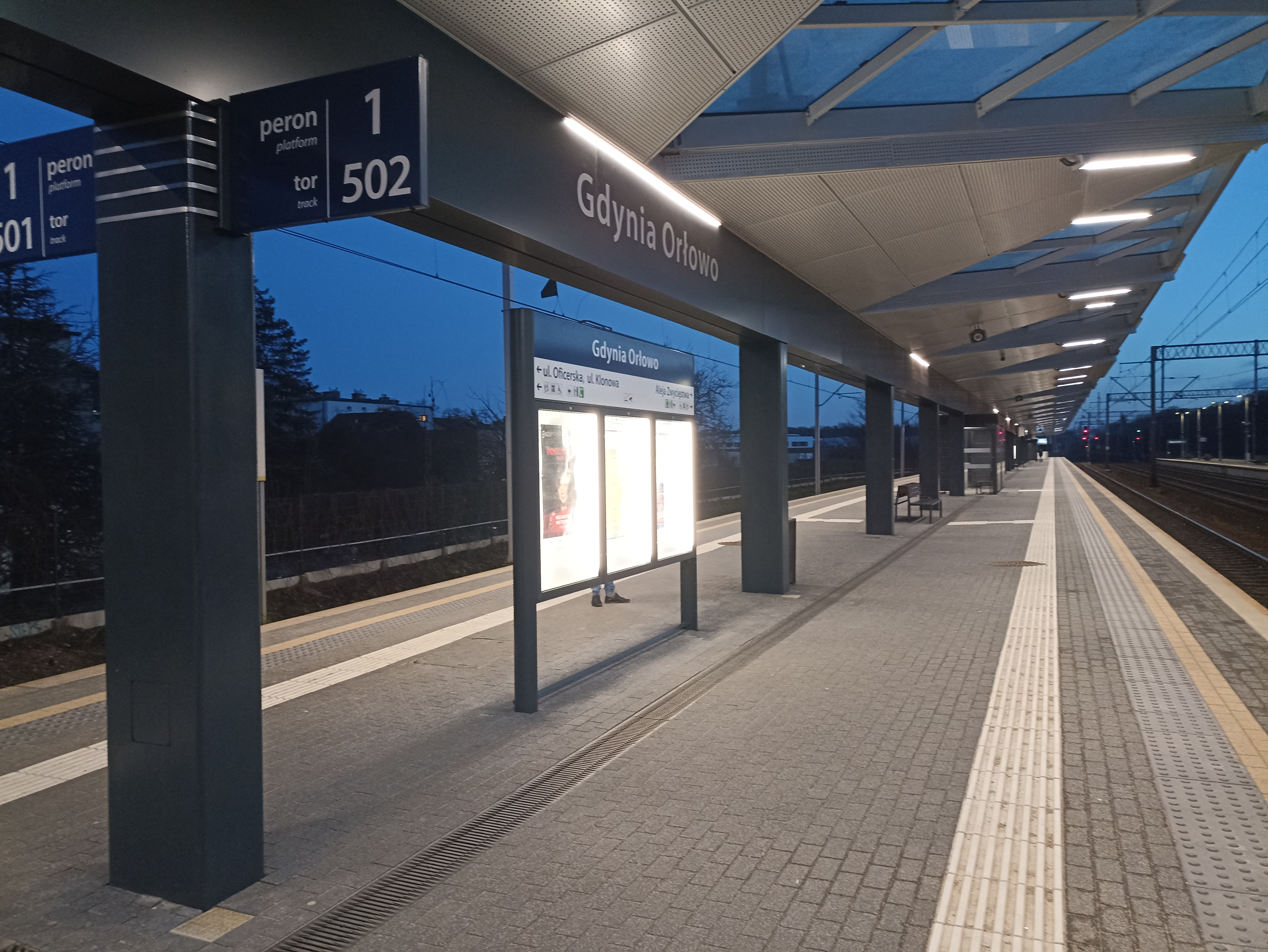
- Gdynia Orłowo railway station

General information
- Location: Gdynia, Pomeranian Voivodeship; Poland
- System: Railway Station
- Operator: PKP Polskie Linie Kolejowe; SKM Tricity
- Lines: 202: Gdańsk–Stargard railway 250: Gdańsk Śródmieście–Rumia railway
- Platforms: 4
- Tracks: 6

History
- Opened: 1928; 98 years ago
- Rebuilt: Start data and age Gdynia Orlowo 2021-2022
Location
- Location within Poland

Gdynia Orłowo railway station is a railway station serving the city of Gdynia, in the Pomeranian Voivodeship, Poland. The station was built between 1927 and 1928 and is located in the Orłowo district on the Gdańsk–Stargard railway and the parallel Gdańsk Śródmieście–Rumia railway. The train services are operated by Polregio and SKM Tricity.

When the station opened it was known as Orłowo Morskie, as it did not become part of Gdynia until 1935. In the years 1928-1939 the station functioned as the border station with the Free City of Danzig (Gdańsk). Before World War II and shortly afterwards, the station had a ticket office, cash luggage, waiting room and a buffet. In 2014 the regional platforms were modernised, including the construction of a new platform, the track and signalling equipment.

== Train services ==
The station is served by the following services:

- Regional services (R) Tczew — Gdynia Chylonia
- Regional services (R) Tczew — Słupsk
- Regional services (R) Malbork — Słupsk
- Regional services (R) Malbork — Gdynia Chylonia
- Regional services (R) Elbląg — Gdynia Chylonia
- Regional services (R) Elbląg — Słupsk
- Regional services (R) Chojnice — Tczew — Gdynia Główna
- Regional services (R) Gdynia Chylonia — Smętowo
- Regional services (R) Gdynia Chylonia — Laskowice Pomorskie
- Regional services (R) Gdynia Chylonia — Bydgoszcz Główna
- Regional services (R) Słupsk — Bydgoszcz Główna
- Pomorska Kolej Metropolitalna services (R) Kościerzyna — Gdańsk Port Lotniczy (Airport) — Gdańsk Wrzeszcz — Gdynia Główna
- Szybka Kolej Miejska services (SKM) (Lębork -) Wejherowo - Reda - Rumia - Gdynia - Sopot - Gdansk

Preceding station	Polregio	Following station
Gdynia Główna towards Gdynia Główna, Gdynia Chylonia or Słupsk	PR	Sopot towards Tczew
Gdynia Główna towards Gdynia Główna, Gdynia Chylonia or Słupsk	PR	Sopot towards Malbork
Gdynia Główna towards Gdynia Główna, Gdynia Chylonia or Słupsk	PR	Sopot towards Elbląg
Gdynia Główna Terminus	PR	Sopot towards Chojnice
Gdynia Główna towards Gdynia Główna, Gdynia Chylonia or Słupsk	PR	Sopot towards Smętowo, Laskowice Pomorskie, or Bydgoszcz Główna
Sopot towards Kościerzyna	PR (Via Gdańsk Port Lotniczy (Airport) and Gdańsk Wrzeszcz)	Gdynia Główna Terminus
Preceding station	SKM Tricity	Following station
Gdynia Redłowo towards Wejherowo or Lębork	SKM Tricity	Sopot Kamienny Potok towards Gdańsk Śródmieście
