= Sopot railway station =

Railway station in Sopot, Poland

Sopot
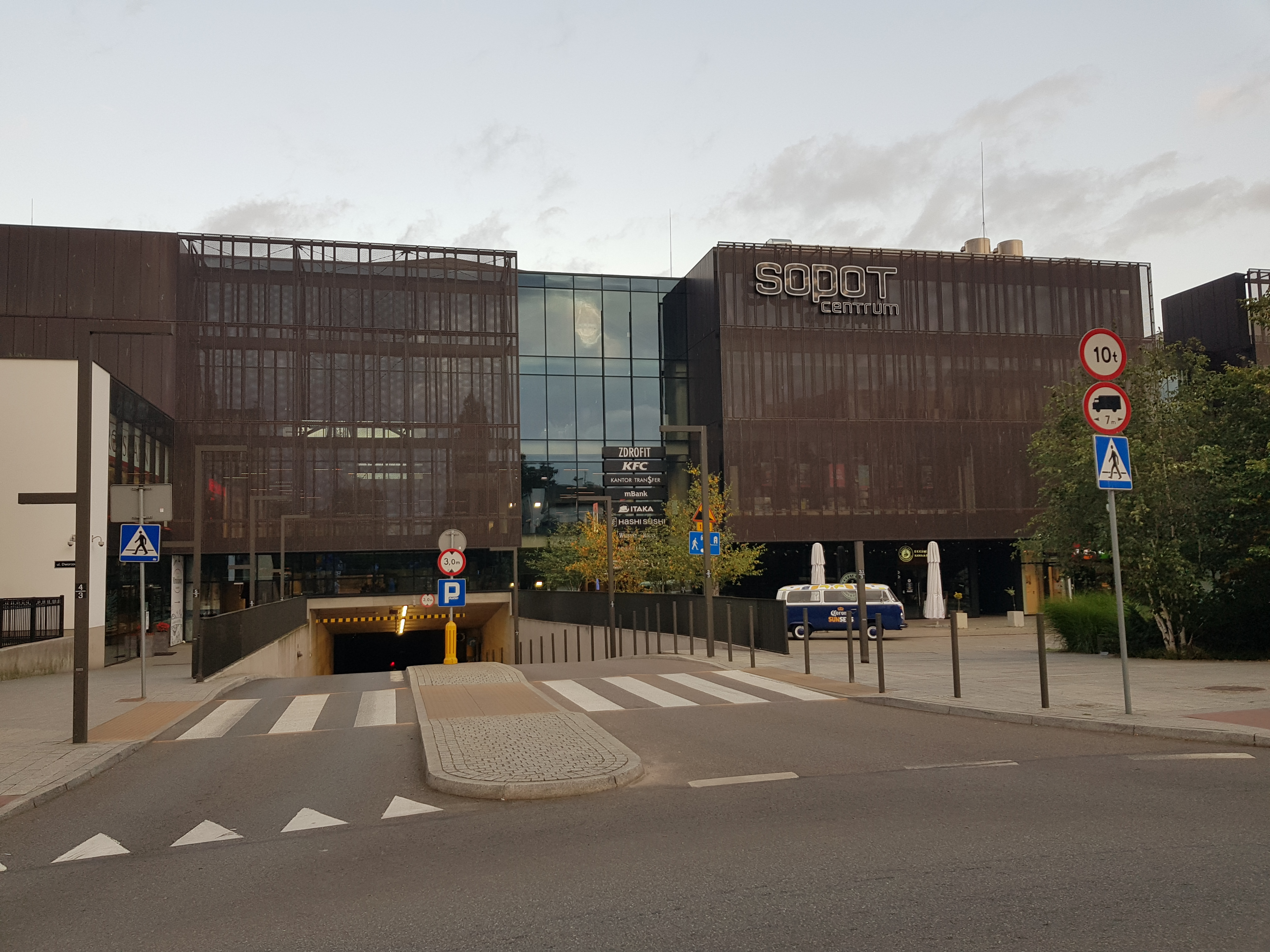
- Sopot railway station

General information
- Location: Sopot, Pomeranian Voivodeship; Poland
- Operator: PKP Polskie Linie Kolejowe; Tricity Rapid Urban Railway
- Lines: Gdańsk–Stargard; Gdańsk Śródmieście–Rumia
- Platforms: 4

History
- Opened: 1 July 1870; 156 years ago
Location
- Location within Poland

Sopot is the main railway station of the city of Sopot, located in the Pomeranian Voivodeship, Poland. The station opened in 1870, with train services being operated by PKP Intercity, Polregio, and the Tricity Rapid Urban Railway (SKM). Masovian Railways trains operate here during the summer.

== Overview ==
The station features two island platforms, of which one functions as the regional commuter SKM stop and the other for long-distance services. The platforms are accessible through two underpasses, one of which connects both tracks. The ticket offices are open all day long.

== History ==
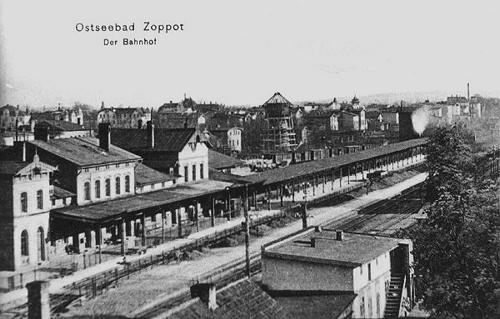
The station around 1890.

The station was built in the years 1868–1870. The railway reached Sopot from Gdańsk (11.7 km) on 1 July 1870. On 1 September of the same year the line from Slupsk and Gdynia (119.5 km) reached Sopot.

In 1907 the first overpass in Sopot was built at ul. Podjazd and in 1909 a pedestrian tunnel was built.

In 1884 the railway station was used by 134,709 passengers. In 1925 this was 11x greater with 1,522,672 passengers. For comparison, at the station Gdańsk Główny in the same year 3,445,006 tickets were sold. In 1909 Sopot had direct train connections from Berlin, Bydgoszcz, Konigsberg, St. Petersburg, Poznan, Szczecin, Torun and Warsaw.

In 1912 the first work began for the construction of a separate pair of tracks for urban traffic from Gdańsk Główny towards Sopot. The work interrupted by the outbreak of World War I. This line was completed between Gdańsk and Sopot Wyścigi in 1925. After World War II, in 1950, it was decided to continue work on the separation of suburban traffic. In 1952 SKM arrived in Sopot and a year later, on 22 July 1953 it was extended to Gdynia (one track). On 1 May 1954 the second track was opened.

== Station building ==
Identical or similar stations were built in Gdańsk-Wrzeszcz, Gdańsk Oliwa, Gdynia Chylonia, Reda, Wejherowo and probably in Lębork. Most of the pre-war station and buildings no longer exist, except for the original platform roofs. In 1945, the original station building was burned down by Soviet troops advancing along the railway tracks on Danzig (Gdansk) from Gdynia in the northwest. In the area of the station resistance was encountered and strongly suppressed. In 1947, the station was rebuilt and the ground floor of the old main building saw the construction in 1972 of the functional/social-realist second station building.

== Modernisation ==
The functionalist 1970s ticket building was torn down in 2013 to make way for a complete redevelopment of the entire station and its surrounding area. This development project was completed and opened on 18 December 2015 after some delays. The station area is now known as Sopot Centrum.

== Train services ==
The station is served by the following services:

- EuroCity services (EC) (EC 95 by DB) (IC by PKP) Gdynia - Gdansk - Bydgoszcz - Poznan - Rzepin - Frankfurt (Oder) - Berlin
- EuroCity services (EC) Gdynia - Gdansk - Malbork - Warsaw - Katowice - Bohumin - Ostrava - Prerov - Breclav - Vienna
- Express Intercity Premium services (EIP) Gdynia - Warsaw
- Express Intercity Premium services (EIP) Gdynia - Warsaw - Katowice - Gliwice/Bielsko-Biała
- Express Intercity Premium services (EIP) Gdynia/Kołobrzeg - Warsaw - Kraków (- Rzeszów)
- Intercity services (IC) Gdynia - Gdansk - Bydgoszcz - Poznań - Wrocław - Opole - Katowice - Kraków - Rzeszów - Przemyśl
- Intercity services (IC) Gdynia - Gdańsk - Bydgoszcz - Toruń - Kutno - Łódź - Częstochowa - Katowice - Bielsko-Biała
- Intercity services (IC) Gdynia - Gdańsk - Bydgoszcz - Łódź - Czestochowa — Kraków — Zakopane
- Intercity services (IC) Gdynia - Gdańsk - Bydgoszcz - Poznań - Zielona Góra
- Intercity services (IC) Gdynia - Gdańsk - Bydgoszcz - Poznań - Wrocław
- Intercity services (IC) Łódź Fabryczna — Warsaw — Gdańsk Glowny — Kołobrzeg
- Intercity services (IC) Szczecin - Koszalin - Słupsk - Gdynia - Gdańsk
- Intercity services (IC) Szczecin - Koszalin - Słupsk - Gdynia - Gdańsk - Elbląg/Iława - Olsztyn
- Intercity services (IC) Szczecin - Koszalin - Słupsk - Gdynia - Gdańsk - Elbląg - Olsztyn - Białystok
- Intercity services (TLK) Gdynia Główna — Kostrzyn
- Intercity services (TLK) Gdynia Główna — Warsaw — Kraków — Zakopane
- Intercity services (TLK) Kołobrzeg — Gdynia Główna — Warszawa Wschodnia — Kraków Główny
- Regional services (R) Tczew — Gdynia Chylonia
- Regional services (R) Tczew — Słupsk
- Regional services (R) Malbork — Słupsk
- Regional services (R) Malbork — Gdynia Chylonia
- Regional services (R) Elbląg — Gdynia Chylonia
- Regional services (R) Elbląg — Słupsk
- Regional services (R) Chojnice — Tczew — Gdynia Główna
- Regional services (R) Gdynia Chylonia — Olsztyn Główny
- Regional services (R) Gdynia Chylonia — Smętowo
- Regional services (R) Gdynia Chylonia — Laskowice Pomorskie
- Regional services (R) Gdynia Chylonia — Bydgoszcz Główna
- Regional services (R) Słupsk — Bydgoszcz Główna
- Regional services (R) Gdynia Chylonia — Pruszcz Gdański
- Pomorska Kolej Metropolitalna services (R) Kościerzyna — Gdańsk Port Lotniczy (Airport) — Gdańsk Wrzeszcz — Gdynia Główna
- Szybka Kolej Miejska services (SKM) (Lębork -) Wejherowo - Reda - Rumia - Gdynia - Sopot - Gdansk

| Preceding station | PKP Intercity | Following station |
|---|---|---|
| Gdynia Główna Terminus | EuroCity EC 95; IC | Gdańsk Oliwa towards Berlin Hbf |
| Gdynia Główna Terminus | EuroCity IC | Gdańsk Oliwa towards Wien Hbf |
| Gdynia Główna Terminus | EIP | Gdańsk Oliwa towards Warszawa Centralna |
| Gdynia Główna Terminus | EIP | Gdańsk Oliwa towards Gliwice or Bielsko-Biała Główna |
| Gdynia Główna towards Gdynia Główna or Kołobrzeg | EIP | Gdańsk Oliwa towards Kraków Główny or Rzeszów Główny |
| Gdynia Główna Terminus | IC | Gdańsk Oliwa towards Przemyśl Główny |
| Gdynia Główna Terminus | IC | Gdańsk Oliwa towards Bielsko-Biała Główna |
| Gdynia Główna Terminus | IC (Via Bydgoszcz, Łódź) | Gdańsk Oliwa towards Zakopane |
| Gdynia Główna Terminus | IC | Gdańsk Oliwa towards Zielona Góra Główna |
| Gdynia Główna Terminus | IC | Gdańsk Oliwa towards Wrocław Główny |
| Gdynia Główna towards Kołobrzeg | IC | Gdańsk Oliwa towards Łódź Fabryczna |
| Gdynia Główna towards Szczecin Główny | IC | Gdańsk Oliwa towards Gdańsk Główny |
| Gdynia Główna towards Szczecin Główny | IC | Gdańsk Oliwa towards Olsztyn Główny |
| Gdynia Główna towards Szczecin Główny | IC | Gdańsk Oliwa towards Białystok |
| Gdynia Główna Terminus | TLK | Gdańsk Oliwa towards Kostrzyn |
| Gdynia Główna Terminus | TLK (Via Warsaw) | Gdańsk Oliwa towards Zakopane |
| Gdynia Główna towards Kołobrzeg | TLK | Gdańsk Oliwa towards Kraków Główny |
| Preceding station | Polregio | Following station |
| Gdynia Orłowo towards Gdynia Główna, Gdynia Chylonia or Słupsk | PR | Gdańsk Oliwa towards Tczew |
| Gdynia Orłowo towards Gdynia Główna, Gdynia Chylonia or Słupsk | PR | Gdańsk Oliwa towards Malbork |
| Gdynia Orłowo towards Gdynia Główna, Gdynia Chylonia or Słupsk | PR | Gdańsk Oliwa towards Elbląg |
| Gdynia Orłowo towards Gdynia Główna | PR | Gdańsk Oliwa towards Chojnice |
| Gdynia Główna towards Gdynia Chylonia | PR | Gdańsk Oliwa towards Olsztyn Główny |
| Gdynia Orłowo towards Gdynia Główna, Gdynia Chylonia or Słupsk | PR | Gdańsk Oliwa towards Smętowo, Laskowice Pomorskie, or Bydgoszcz Główna |
| Gdynia Główna towards Gdynia Chylonia | PR | Gdańsk Oliwa towards Pruszcz Gdański |
| Gdańsk Oliwa towards Kościerzyna | PR (Via Gdańsk Port Lotniczy (Airport) and Gdańsk Wrzeszcz) | Gdynia Orłowo towards Gdynia Główna |
| Preceding station | SKM Tricity | Following station |
| Sopot Kamienny Potok towards Wejherowo or Lębork | SKM Tricity | Sopot Wyścigi towards Gdańsk Śródmieście |
