= List of busiest railway stations in Poland =

This is a list of the busiest railway stations in Poland sorted by the annual number of entries and exists in 2024, showing the top ten stations. Statistics and data are collected by the Office of Rail Transport.

== List ==
Rank	Railway Station	Entries/exits (2024)		City	Voivodeship	Picture
Rank	Railway Station	Annual (millions)	Daily (thousands)	City	Voivodeship	Picture
1	Wrocław Główny	28.78	78.64	Wrocław	Lower Silesian	
2	Kraków Główny	26.90	23.08	Kraków	Lesser Poland	
3	Poznań Główny	26.90	24.48	Poznań	Greater Poland	
4	Warszawa Centralna	20.04	12.78	Warsaw	Masovian	
5	Gdańsk Główny	17.66	13.84	Gdańsk	Pomeranian	
6	Katowice	16.33	17.60	Katowice	Silesian	
7	Gdańsk Wrzeszcz	16.13	12.01	Gdańsk	Pomeranian	
8	Gdynia Główna	14.89	14.73	Gdynia	Pomeranian	
9	Warszawa Wschodnia	13.51	12.38	Warsaw	Masovian	
10	Sopot	10.06	9.51	Sopot	Pomeranian	
