= Sopot Kamienny Potok railway station =

Railway station in Sopot, Poland

Sopot Kamienny Potok
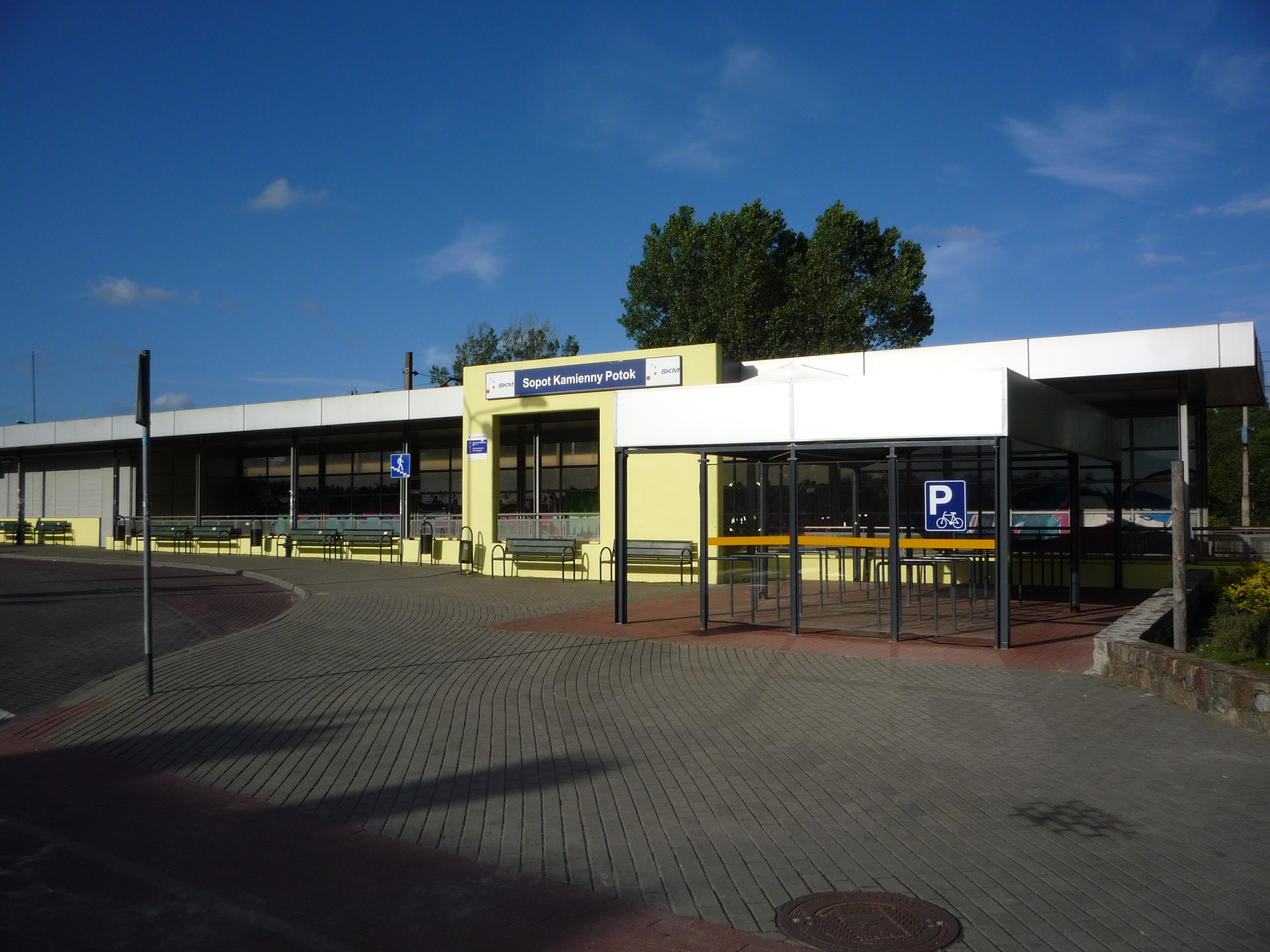
- Sopot Kamienny Potok railway station

General information
- Location: Sopot, Pomeranian Voivodeship; Poland
- System: Railway Station
- Operator: SKM Tricity
- Line: 250: Gdańsk Śródmieście–Rumia railway
- Platforms: 2
- Tracks: 4

History
- Opened: 1950; 76 years ago
Location
- Location within Poland

Sopot Kamienny Potok railway station is a railway station serving the city of Sopot, in the Pomeranian Voivodeship, Poland. The station opened in 1950 and is located on the Gdańsk Śródmieście–Rumia railway. The train services are operated by SKM Tricity.

== Train services ==
The station is served by the following service(s):

- Szybka Kolej Miejska services (SKM) (Lębork -) Wejherowo - Reda - Rumia - Gdynia - Sopot - Gdansk

Preceding station	SKM Tricity	Following station
Gdynia Orłowo towards Wejherowo or Lębork	SKM Tricity	Sopot towards Gdańsk Śródmieście
