= Gdynia Główna railway station =

Railway station in Pomeranian Voivodeship, Poland

Gdynia Główna
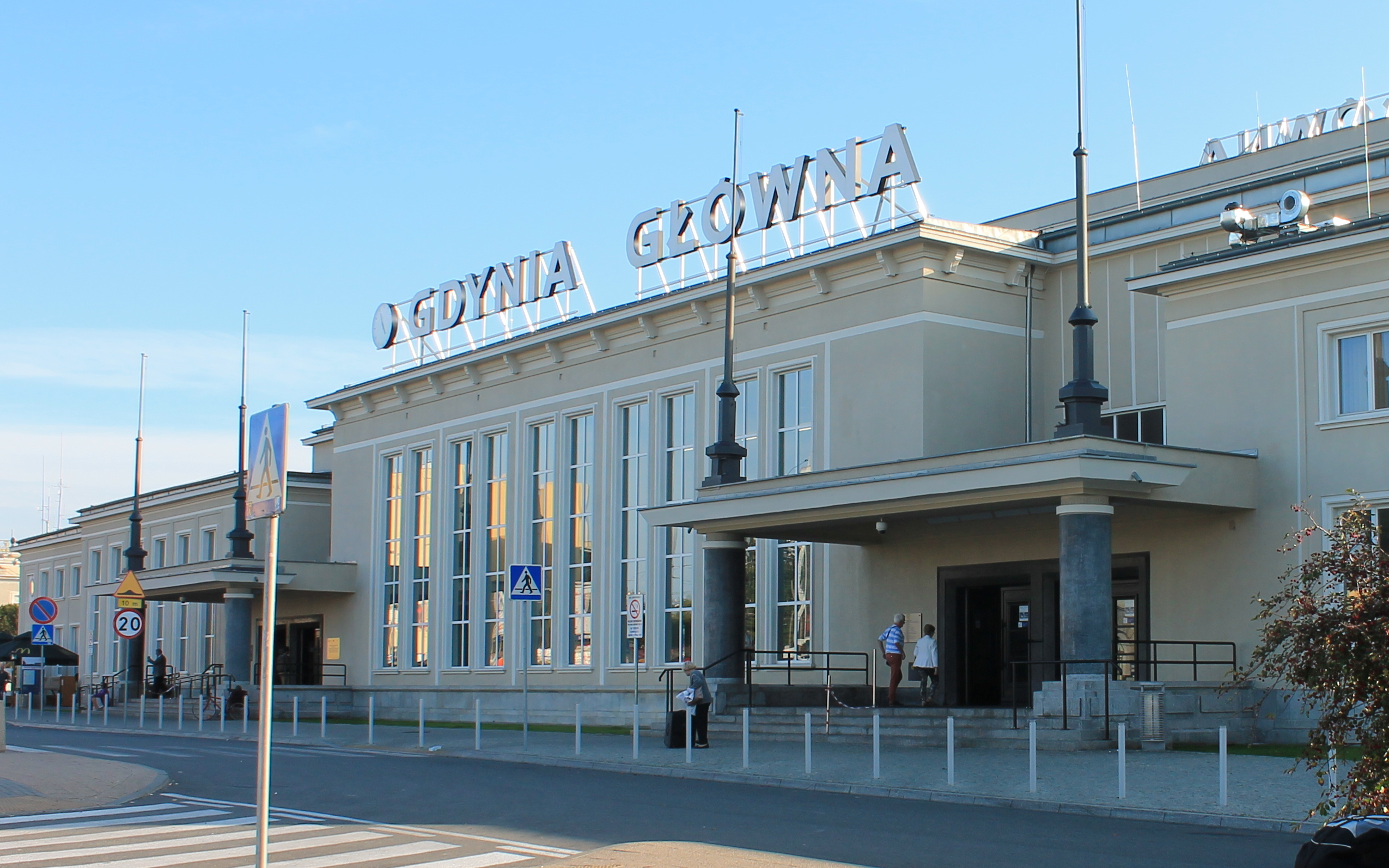
- Gdynia Główna railway station

General information
- Location: Gdynia, Pomeranian Voivodeship; Poland
- System: Railway station
- Operator: PKP Polskie Linie Kolejowe; SKM Tricity
- Lines: 201: Nowa Wieś Wielka–Gdynia Port railway; 202: Gdańsk–Stargard railway; 250: Gdańsk Śródmieście–Rumia railway
- Platforms: 10

History
- Opened: 1 January 1894; 132 years ago
- Rebuilt: 1923–1926; 1957; 2008–2012
Location
- Location within Poland

Gdynia Główna railway station (Polish for Gdynia main station) is the main railway station serving the city of Gdynia in the Pomeranian Voivodeship, Poland. It served 13.41 million passengers in 2022, making it the busiest in the Pomeranian Voivodeship and the sixth busiest railway station in Poland. The station opened in 1921 and is located on the Nowa Wieś Wielka–Gdynia Port railway, Gdańsk–Stargard railway and the parallel Gdańsk Śródmieście–Rumia railway. Trains are operated by PKP, Polregio and SKM Tricity. The station is located in a historic modernist building.

== History ==
The first railway station in the centre of Gdynia opened on 1 January 1894. Initially, it held only a small wooden waiting room, several lamps and a board identifying name of the stop. In 1920, Gdynia began to grow very quickly as a city and a port under the Second Polish Republic, and this resulted in a significant increase in passenger rail traffic. Therefore, between 1923 and 1926, a new imposing art-deco (with regional Pomeranian accents) main building was constructed, designed by Romuald Miller and opening on 15 July 1926. Its interior featured a large waiting room, ticket windows, toilets, luggage storage, a restaurant, bookstore, money exchange, and hairdresser.

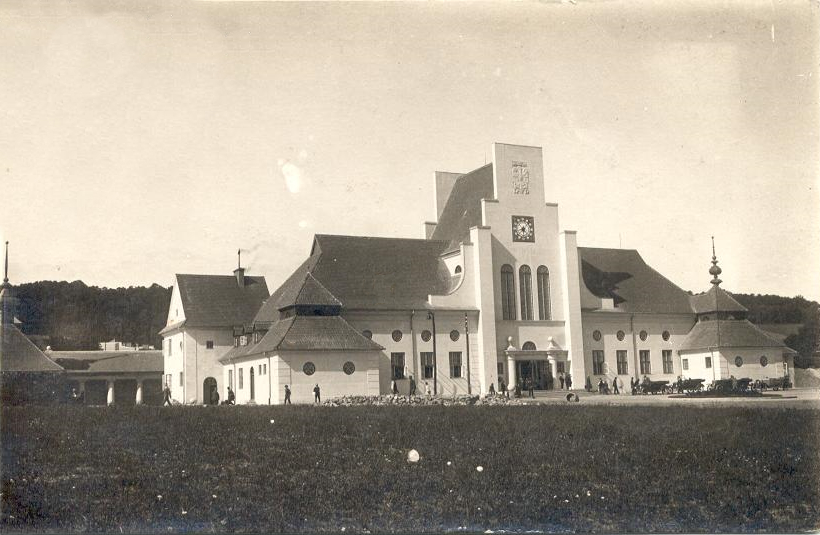
Gdynia Główna in 1926

The railway station building was destroyed in World War II. In the 1950s a new station was built, designed by professor Wacław Tomaszewski. The building is a unique combination of social realism and pre-war art-moderne modernism. In the station's main waiting room several notable wall and ceiling frescoes of sea landscapes were re-discovered during the 2008 renovation after having been covered over in the intervening years. In the dining hall, the wall paintings depict the celestial bodies and signs of the zodiac, and a mosaic illustrates Pegasus.

The station under Nazi German occupation was known as Gotenhafen. Until 11 March 2004, the station was officially called Gdynia Osobowa. Then all the markings were changed to "Gdynia Glowna"; among others, a large inscription saying "Osobowa" on the station building was dismantled.

== Modernisation ==
In August 2008, the station building was entered in the register of monuments. In the same year, a modernisation program of the station was initiated, which included reconstruction of the station concourse, new canopies on the platforms, and changes in the rail traffic control system. During this work, in 2011, an original 5-metre (16 ft) long brick wall from the 1926 station was discovered. It has been preserved and integrated into the newly renovated interior. On 6 June 2012 the modernised station was officially opened. The investment cost 40.7 million euro and was financed in part with EU funds.

== Train services ==
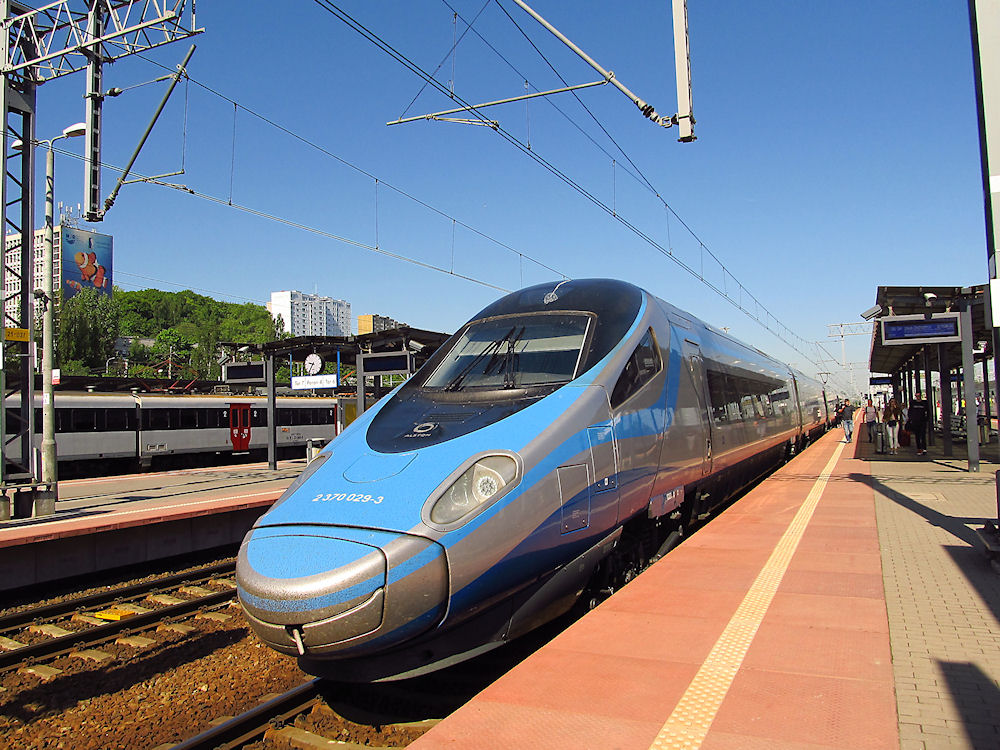
Express InterCity Premium in Gdynia

The station is served by the following services:

- EuroCity services (EC) (EC 95 by DB) (IC by PKP) Gdynia - Gdansk - Bydgoszcz - Poznan - Rzepin - Frankfurt (Oder) - Berlin
- EuroCity services (EC) Gdynia - Gdansk - Malbork - Warsaw - Katowice - Bohumin - Ostrava - Prerov - Breclav - Vienna
- Express Intercity Premium services (EIP) Gdynia - Warsaw
- Express Intercity Premium services (EIP) Gdynia - Warsaw - Katowice - Gliwice/Bielsko-Biała
- Express Intercity Premium services (EIP) Gdynia/Kołobrzeg - Warsaw - Kraków (- Rzeszów)
- Intercity services (IC) Gdynia - Gdansk - Bydgoszcz - Poznań - Wrocław - Opole - Katowice - Kraków - Rzeszów - Przemyśl
- Intercity services (IC) Gdynia - Gdańsk - Bydgoszcz - Toruń - Kutno - Łódź - Częstochowa - Katowice - Bielsko-Biała
- Intercity services (IC) Gdynia - Gdańsk - Bydgoszcz - Łódź - Czestochowa — Kraków — Zakopane
- Intercity services (IC) Gdynia - Gdańsk - Bydgoszcz - Poznań - Zielona Góra
- Intercity services (IC) Gdynia - Gdańsk - Bydgoszcz - Poznań - Wrocław
- Intercity services (IC) Łódź Fabryczna — Warsaw — Gdańsk Glowny — Kołobrzeg
- Intercity services (IC) Szczecin - Koszalin - Słupsk - Gdynia - Gdańsk
- Intercity services (IC) Szczecin - Koszalin - Słupsk - Gdynia - Gdańsk - Elbląg/Iława - Olsztyn
- Intercity services (IC) Szczecin - Koszalin - Słupsk - Gdynia - Gdańsk - Elbląg - Olsztyn - Białystok
- Intercity services (TLK) Gdynia Główna — Kostrzyn
- Intercity services (TLK) Gdynia Główna — Warsaw — Kraków — Zakopane
- Intercity services (TLK) Kołobrzeg — Gdynia Główna — Warszawa Wschodnia — Kraków Główny
- Regional services (R) Tczew — Gdynia Chylonia
- Regional services (R) Tczew — Słupsk
- Regional services (R) Malbork — Słupsk
- Regional services (R) Malbork — Gdynia Chylonia
- Regional services (R) Elbląg — Gdynia Chylonia
- Regional services (R) Elbląg — Słupsk
- Regional services (R) Chojnice — Tczew — Gdynia Główna
- Regional services (R) Gdynia Chylonia — Olsztyn Główny
- Regional services (R) Gdynia Chylonia — Smętowo
- Regional services (R) Gdynia Chylonia — Laskowice Pomorskie
- Regional services (R) Gdynia Chylonia — Bydgoszcz Główna
- Regional services (R) Słupsk — Bydgoszcz Główna
- Regional services (R) Gdynia Chylonia — Pruszcz Gdański
- Regional services (R) Hel - Władysławowo - Reda - Gdynia Główna
- Regional services (R) Luzino — Gdynia Główna
- Regional services (R) Słupsk — Gdynia Główna
- Pomorska Kolej Metropolitalna services (R) Gdynia Główna — Gdańsk Osowa — Gdańsk Port Lotniczy (Airport) — Gdańsk Wrzeszcz
- Pomorska Kolej Metropolitalna services (R) Kościerzyna — Gdańsk Osowa — Gdynia Główna
- Pomorska Kolej Metropolitalna services (R) Kościerzyna — Gdańsk Port Lotniczy (Airport) — Gdańsk Wrzeszcz — Gdynia Główna
- Szybka Kolej Miejska services (SKM) (Lębork -) Wejherowo - Reda - Rumia - Gdynia - Sopot - Gdansk

Preceding station	PKP Intercity	Following station
Terminus	EuroCity EC 95; IC	Sopot (Airport) towards Berlin Hbf
Terminus	EuroCity IC	Sopot towards Wien Hbf
Terminus	EIP	Sopot towards Warszawa Centralna
Terminus	EIP	Sopot towards Gliwice or Bielsko-Biała Główna
Lębork towards Kołobrzeg	EIP	Sopot towards Kraków Główny
Terminus	EIP	Sopot towards Kraków Główny or Rzeszów Główny
Terminus	IC	Sopot towards Przemyśl Główny
Terminus	IC	Sopot towards Bielsko-Biała Główna
Terminus	IC (Via Bydgoszcz, Łódź)	Sopot towards Zakopane
Terminus	IC	Sopot towards Zielona Góra Główna
Terminus	IC	Sopot towards Wrocław Główny
Rumia towards Kołobrzeg	IC	Sopot towards Łódź Fabryczna
Rumia towards Szczecin Główny	IC	Sopot towards Gdańsk Główny
Rumia towards Szczecin Główny	IC	Sopot towards Olsztyn Główny
Rumia towards Szczecin Główny	IC	Sopot towards Białystok
Terminus	TLK	Sopot towards Kostrzyn
Terminus	TLK (Via Warsaw)	Sopot towards Zakopane
Rumia towards Kołobrzeg	TLK	Sopot towards Kraków Główny
Preceding station	Polregio	Following station
Terminus	PR (Tczew)	Gdynia Orłowo towards Tczew
Gdynia Chylonia towards Gdynia Chylonia or Słupsk	PR (Tczew)	Gdynia Orłowo towards Tczew
Terminus	PR (Malbork)	Gdynia Orłowo towards Malbork
Gdynia Chylonia towards Gdynia Chylonia or Słupsk	PR (Malbork)	Gdynia Orłowo towards Malbork
Terminus	PR (Elbląg)	Gdynia Orłowo towards Elbląg
Gdynia Chylonia towards Gdynia Chylonia or Słupsk	PR (Elbląg)	Gdynia Orłowo towards Elbląg
Terminus	PR	Gdynia Orłowo towards Chojnice
Gdynia Chylonia Terminus	PR	Sopot towards Olsztyn Główny
Terminus	PR (Smętowo/Laskowice Pomorskie/Bydgoszcz Główna)	Gdynia Orłowo towards Smętowo, Laskowice Pomorskie, or Bydgoszcz Główna
Gdynia Chylonia towards Gdynia Chylonia or Słupsk	PR (Smętowo/Laskowice Pomorskie/Bydgoszcz Główna)	Gdynia Orłowo towards Smętowo, Laskowice Pomorskie, or Bydgoszcz Główna
Gdynia Chylonia Terminus	PR	Sopot towards Pruszcz Gdański
Gdynia Chylonia towards Luzino or Słupsk	PR	Terminus
Terminus	PR (Via Gdańsk Port Lotniczy (Airport))	Gdynia Stadion towards Gdańsk Wrzeszcz
Gdynia Stadion towards Kościerzyna	PR (Via Gdańsk Osowa)	Terminus
Gdynia Orłowo towards Kościerzyna	PR (Via Gdańsk Port Lotniczy (Airport) and Gdańsk Wrzeszcz)	Terminus
Gdynia Chylonia towards Hel	PR	Terminus
Preceding station	SKM Tricity	Following station
Gdynia Stocznia towards Wejherowo or Lębork	SKM Tricity	Gdynia Wzgórze św. Maksymiliana towards Gdańsk Śródmieście
Gdynia Wielki Kack towards Gdańsk Wrzeszcz or Kościerzyna	SKM Tricity	Terminus
