= Gdańsk Wrzeszcz railway station =

Railway station in Gdańsk, Poland

Gdańsk Wrzeszcz
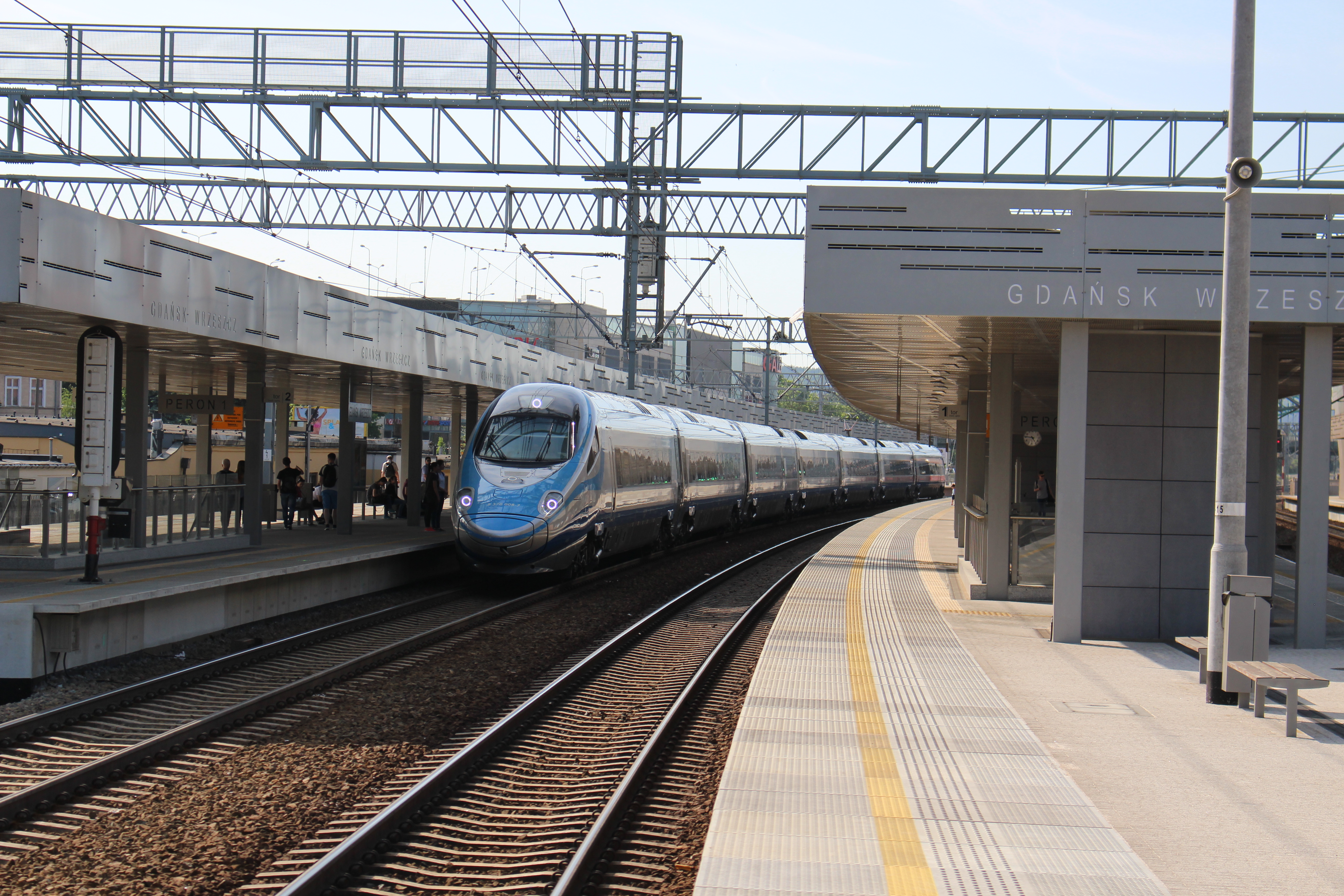
- Station platforms in May 2016. Galeria Metropolia shopping centre can be seen in the far left background.

General information
- Location: Gdańsk, Pomeranian Voivodeship; Poland
- System: Railway Station
- Operator: PKP Polskie Linie Kolejowe; SKM Tricity
- Lines: 202: Gdańsk–Stargard railway 248: Gdańsk Wrzeszcz–Gdańsk Osowa railway 250: Gdańsk Śródmieście–Rumia railway
- Platforms: 6
- Tracks: 6

Construction
- Accessible: yes

History
- Opened: 1 July 1870; 156 years ago
- Rebuilt: 1952, 1969, 2014–15, 2021–23
- Former names: Danzig Langfuhr (until 1945)

Passengers
- 10,800,000 (2022)
Location
- Location within Poland

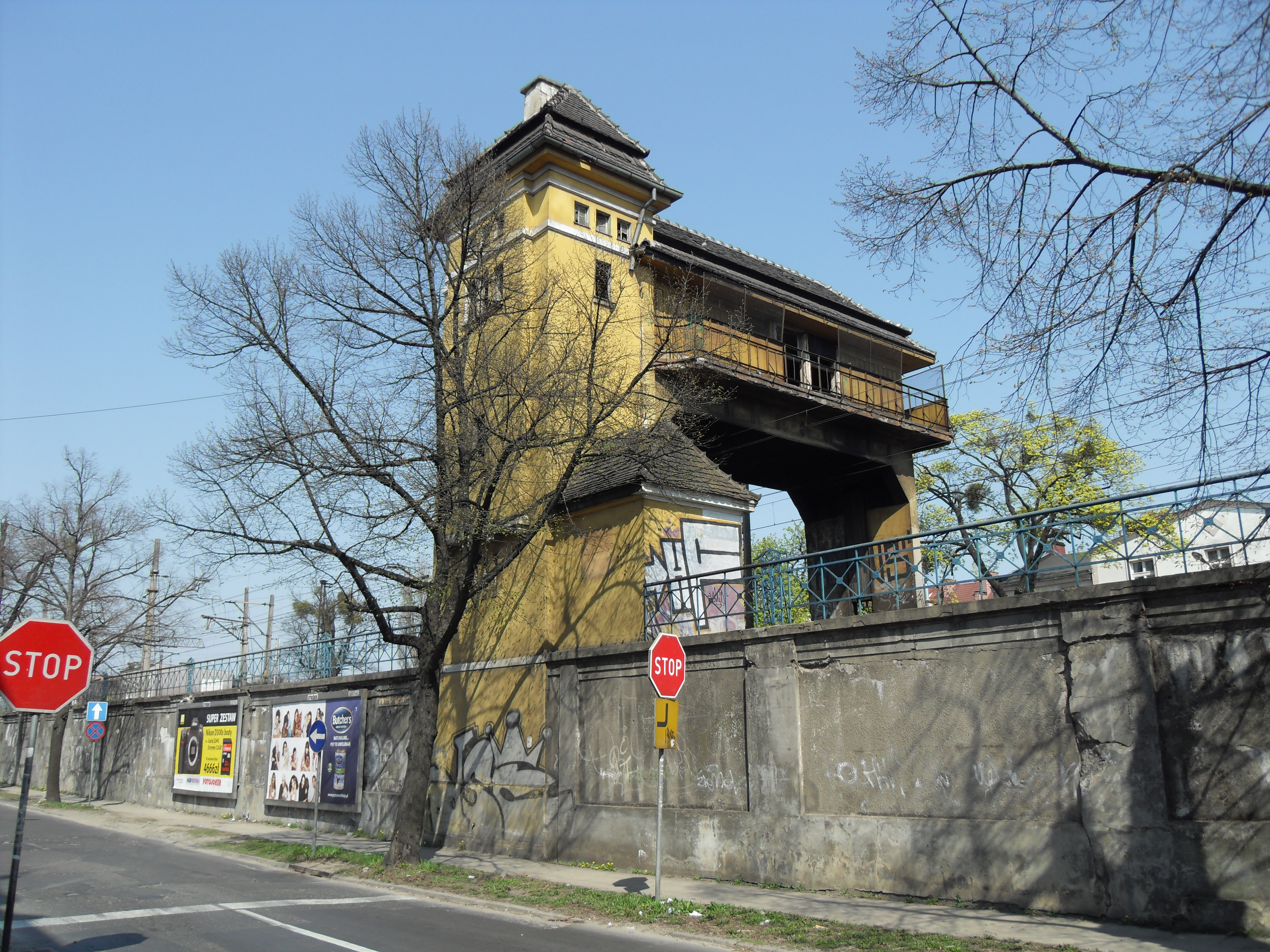
Old signal box in April 2011.

Gdańsk Wrzeszcz railway station is a railway station serving the city of Gdańsk, in the Pomeranian Voivodeship, Poland. The station opened in 1870 and is located on the Gdańsk–Stargard railway, the parallel Gdańsk Śródmieście–Rumia railway and Gdańsk Wrzeszcz–Gdańsk Osowa railway. The station is located in the Wrzeszcz quarter of the city. The train services are operated by PKP, Polregio and SKM Tricity. Masovian Railways trains operate here during the summer.

== General information ==
The station was built and opened in 1870 as part of a new railway line from Szczecin to Gdańsk. This was the third established railway line in Gdańsk (the line Gdańsk-Tczew and the railway line No. 249 to the Port).

On 2 January 1952, the SKM Trójmiasto suburban railway was opened, parallel to the existing line.

The station features three island platforms, of which one functions as the regional commuter SKM stop and the other for long-distance services and the Pomorska Kolej Metropolitalna services. The platforms are accessible through two underpasses which connect all six platforms. The ticket offices are open all day long.

The station used to be known as Danzig Langfuhr during Prussian/German rule and Free City of Danzig eras.

== Signal box ==
In the early twentieth century (circa 1913) on the railway embankment a control room Gantry was built, the only one of its kind in northern Poland. Architects incorporated into it in the eclectic style of the district. In May 2015, in the face of intention to demolish this unique object by PKP (in all of Poland there are only five such signal boxes, all others are located in the Upper Silesia), it was added to the register of monuments.

== Station building ==
The current station building was opened on 30 November 2023. It replaced the old building commissioned on 8 March 1969. Present building features five teller windows, a waiting room, and a glass wall with a view on the adjacent bus terminal. Along with new building a biking garage was built, however, as of December 2023 it has not been opened yet.
The station was previously renovated between 2014 and 2015. One new platform was built and existing ones were modernized. Accessibility of the station was improved by adding slip-resistant surfaces and aids for the visually impaired. Existing underground passage was also renovated.
Since October 2016, the station offers direct access to Galeria Metropolia shopping centre; the station is also within walking distance of Galeria Bałtycka shopping centre, opened in 2007.

== History ==
The old red brick station building can still be seen near the bus stops, where it has been converted to residential flats. A very similar station building is still operational at the Gdańsk Oliwa railway station.

== Train services ==
The station is served by the following services:

- EuroCity services (EC) (EC 95 by DB) (IC by PKP) Gdynia - Gdansk - Bydgoszcz - Poznan - Rzepin - Frankfurt (Oder) - Berlin
- EuroCity services (EC) Gdynia - Gdansk - Malbork - Warsaw - Katowice - Bohumin - Ostrava - Prerov - Breclav - Vienna
- Express Intercity Premium services (EIP) Gdynia - Warsaw
- Express Intercity Premium services (EIP) Gdynia - Warsaw - Katowice - Gliwice/Bielsko-Biała
- Express Intercity Premium services (EIP) Gdynia/Kołobrzeg - Warsaw - Kraków (- Rzeszów)
- Intercity services (IC) Gdynia - Gdansk - Bydgoszcz - Poznań - Wrocław - Opole - Katowice - Kraków - Rzeszów - Przemyśl
- Intercity services (IC) Gdynia - Gdańsk - Bydgoszcz - Toruń - Kutno - Łódź - Częstochowa - Katowice - Bielsko-Biała
- Intercity services (IC) Gdynia - Gdańsk - Bydgoszcz - Łódź - Czestochowa — Krakow — Zakopane
- Intercity services (IC) Gdynia - Gdańsk - Bydgoszcz - Poznań - Zielona Góra
- Intercity services (IC) Gdynia - Gdańsk - Bydgoszcz - Poznań - Wrocław
- Intercity services (IC) Łódź Fabryczna — Warsaw — Gdańsk Glowny — Kołobrzeg
- Intercity services (IC) Szczecin - Koszalin - Słupsk - Gdynia - Gdańsk
- Intercity services (IC) Szczecin - Koszalin - Słupsk - Gdynia - Gdańsk - Elbląg/Iława - Olsztyn
- Intercity services (IC) Szczecin - Koszalin - Słupsk - Gdynia - Gdańsk - Elbląg - Olsztyn - Białystok
- Intercity services (TLK) Gdynia Główna — Kostrzyn
- Intercity services (TLK) Gdynia Główna — Warsaw — Kraków — Zakopane
- Intercity services (TLK) Kołobrzeg — Gdynia Główna — Warszawa Wschodnia — Kraków Główny
- Regional services (R) Tczew — Gdynia Chylonia
- Regional services (R) Tczew — Słupsk
- Regional services (R) Malbork — Słupsk
- Regional services (R) Malbork — Gdynia Chylonia
- Regional services (R) Elbląg — Gdynia Chylonia
- Regional services (R) Elbląg — Słupsk
- Regional services (R) Chojnice — Tczew — Gdynia Główna
- Regional services (R) Gdynia Chylonia — Olsztyn Główny
- Regional services (R) Gdynia Chylonia — Smętowo
- Regional services (R) Gdynia Chylonia — Laskowice Pomorskie
- Regional services (R) Gdynia Chylonia — Bydgoszcz Główna
- Regional services (R) Słupsk — Bydgoszcz Główna
- Regional services (R) Gdynia Chylonia — Pruszcz Gdański
- Pomorska Kolej Metropolitalna services (R) Gdynia Główna — Gdańsk Osowa — Gdańsk Port Lotniczy (Airport) — Gdańsk Wrzeszcz
- Pomorska Kolej Metropolitalna services (R) Kartuzy — Gdańsk Port Lotniczy (Airport) — Gdańsk Główny
- Pomorska Kolej Metropolitalna services (R) Kościerzyna — Gdańsk Port Lotniczy (Airport) — Gdańsk Wrzeszcz — Gdynia Główna
- Szybka Kolej Miejska w Trójmieście services (SKM) (Lębork -) Wejherowo - Reda - Rumia - Gdynia - Sopot - Gdansk

Preceding station	PKP Intercity	Following station
Gdańsk Oliwa towards Gdynia Główna	EuroCity EC 95; IC	Gdańsk Główny towards Berlin Hbf
Gdańsk Oliwa towards Gdynia Główna	EuroCity IC	Gdańsk Główny towards Wien Hbf
Gdańsk Oliwa towards Gdynia Główna	EIP	Gdańsk Główny towards Warszawa Centralna
Gdańsk Oliwa towards Gdynia Główna	EIP	Gdańsk Główny towards Gliwice or Bielsko-Biała Główna
Gdańsk Oliwa towards Gdynia Główna or Kołobrzeg	EIP	Gdańsk Główny towards Kraków Główny or Rzeszów Główny
Gdańsk Oliwa towards Gdynia Główna	IC	Gdańsk Główny towards Przemyśl Główny
Gdańsk Oliwa towards Gdynia Główna	IC	Gdańsk Główny towards Bielsko-Biała Główna
Gdańsk Oliwa towards Gdynia Główna	IC (Via Bydgoszcz, Łódź)	Gdańsk Główny towards Zakopane
Gdańsk Oliwa towards Gdynia Główna	IC	Gdańsk Główny towards Zielona Góra Główna
Gdańsk Oliwa towards Gdynia Główna	IC	Gdańsk Główny towards Wrocław Główny
Gdańsk Oliwa towards Kołobrzeg	IC	Gdańsk Główny towards Łódź Fabryczna
Gdańsk Oliwa towards Szczecin Główny	IC	Gdańsk Główny Terminus
Gdańsk Oliwa towards Szczecin Główny	IC	Gdańsk Główny towards Olsztyn Główny
Gdańsk Oliwa towards Szczecin Główny	IC	Gdańsk Główny towards Białystok
Gdańsk Oliwa towards Gdynia Główna	TLK	Gdańsk Główny towards Kostrzyn
Gdańsk Oliwa towards Gdynia Główna	TLK (Via Warsaw)	Gdańsk Główny towards Zakopane
Gdańsk Oliwa towards Kołobrzeg	TLK	Gdańsk Główny towards Kraków Główny
Preceding station	Polregio	Following station
Gdańsk Oliwa towards Gdynia Główna, Gdynia Chylonia or Słupsk	PR	Gdańsk Główny towards Tczew
Gdańsk Oliwa towards Gdynia Główna, Gdynia Chylonia or Słupsk	PR	Gdańsk Główny towards Malbork
Gdańsk Oliwa towards Gdynia Główna, Gdynia Chylonia or Słupsk	PR	Gdańsk Główny towards Elbląg
Gdańsk Oliwa towards Gdynia Główna	PR	Gdańsk Główny towards Chojnice
Gdańsk Oliwa towards Gdynia Chylonia	PR	Gdańsk Główny towards Olsztyn Główny
Gdańsk Oliwa towards Gdynia Główna, Gdynia Chylonia or Słupsk	PR	Gdańsk Główny towards Smętowo, Laskowice Pomorskie, or Bydgoszcz Główna
Gdańsk Oliwa towards Gdynia Chylonia	PR	Gdańsk Główny towards Pruszcz Gdański
Gdańsk Strzyża towards Gdynia Główna	PR (Via Gdańsk Port Lotniczy (Airport))	Terminus
Gdańsk Główny Terminus	PR (Via Gdańsk Port Lotniczy (Airport))	Gdańsk Strzyża towards Kartuzy
Gdańsk Strzyża towards Kościerzyna	PR (Via Gdańsk Port Lotniczy (Airport) and Gdańsk Wrzeszcz)	Gdańsk Oliwa towards Gdynia Główna
Preceding station	SKM Tricity	Following station
Gdańsk Zaspa towards Wejherowo or Lębork	SKM Tricity	Gdańsk Politechnika towards Gdańsk Śródmieście
