= Gdynia Chylonia railway station =

Railway station in Gdynia, Poland

Gdynia Chylonia
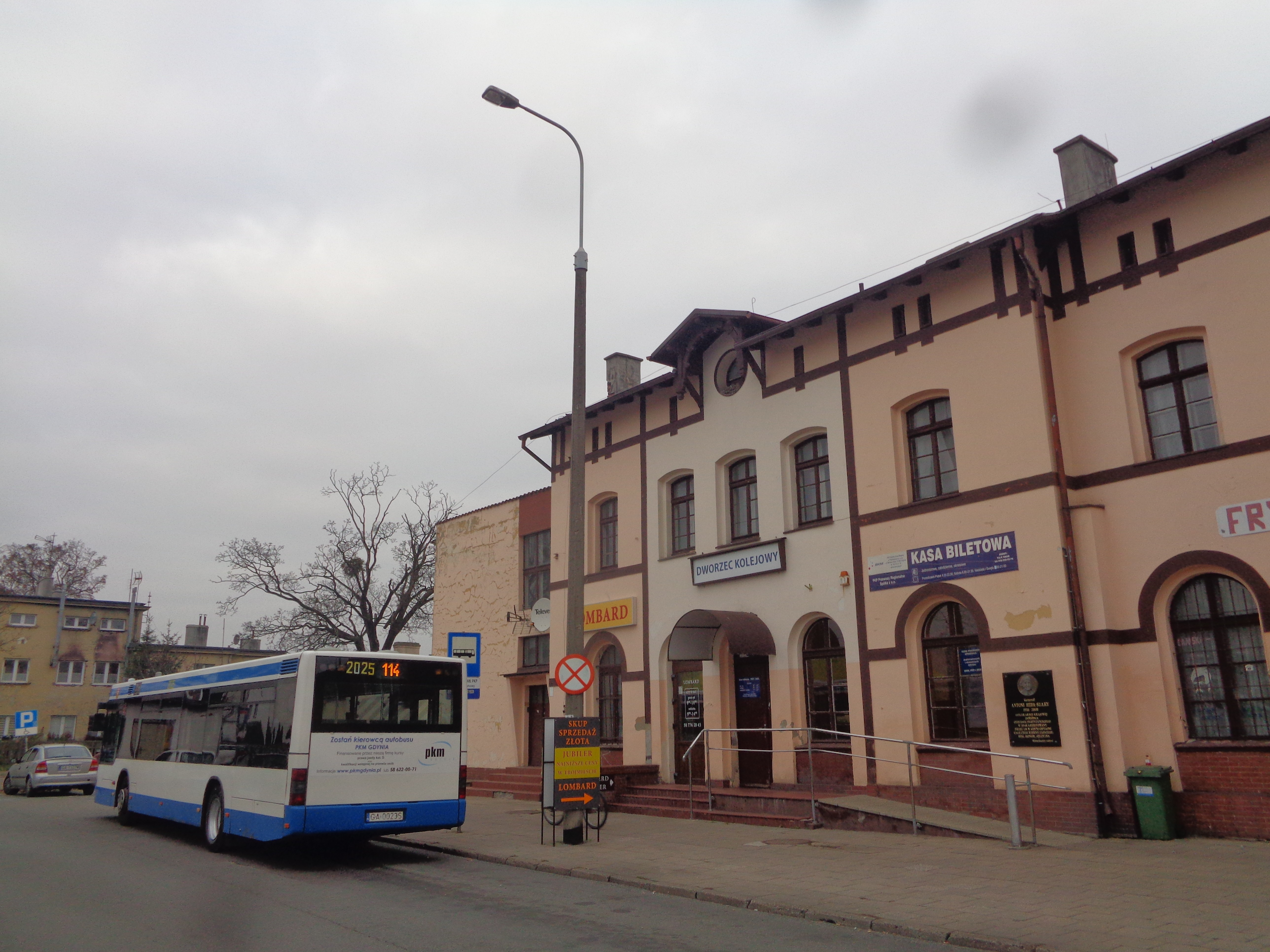

General information
- Location: Gdynia, Pomeranian Voivodeship; Poland
- System: Railway Station
- Operator: PKP Polskie Linie Kolejowe; SKM Tricity
- Lines: 202: Gdańsk–Stargard railway 250: Gdańsk Śródmieście–Rumia railway
- Platforms: 4
- Tracks: 5

History
- Opened: 1870; 156 years ago
- Rebuilt: 2014
Location
- Location within Poland

Gdynia Chylonia railway station is a railway station serving the city of Gdynia, in the Pomeranian Voivodeship, Poland. The station opened in 1870 and is located in the Chylonia district on the Gdańsk–Stargard railway and the parallel Gdańsk Śródmieście–Rumia railway. The train services are operated by Polregio and SKM Tricity.

There is a memorial plaque to Polish General Antoni Heda at the station.

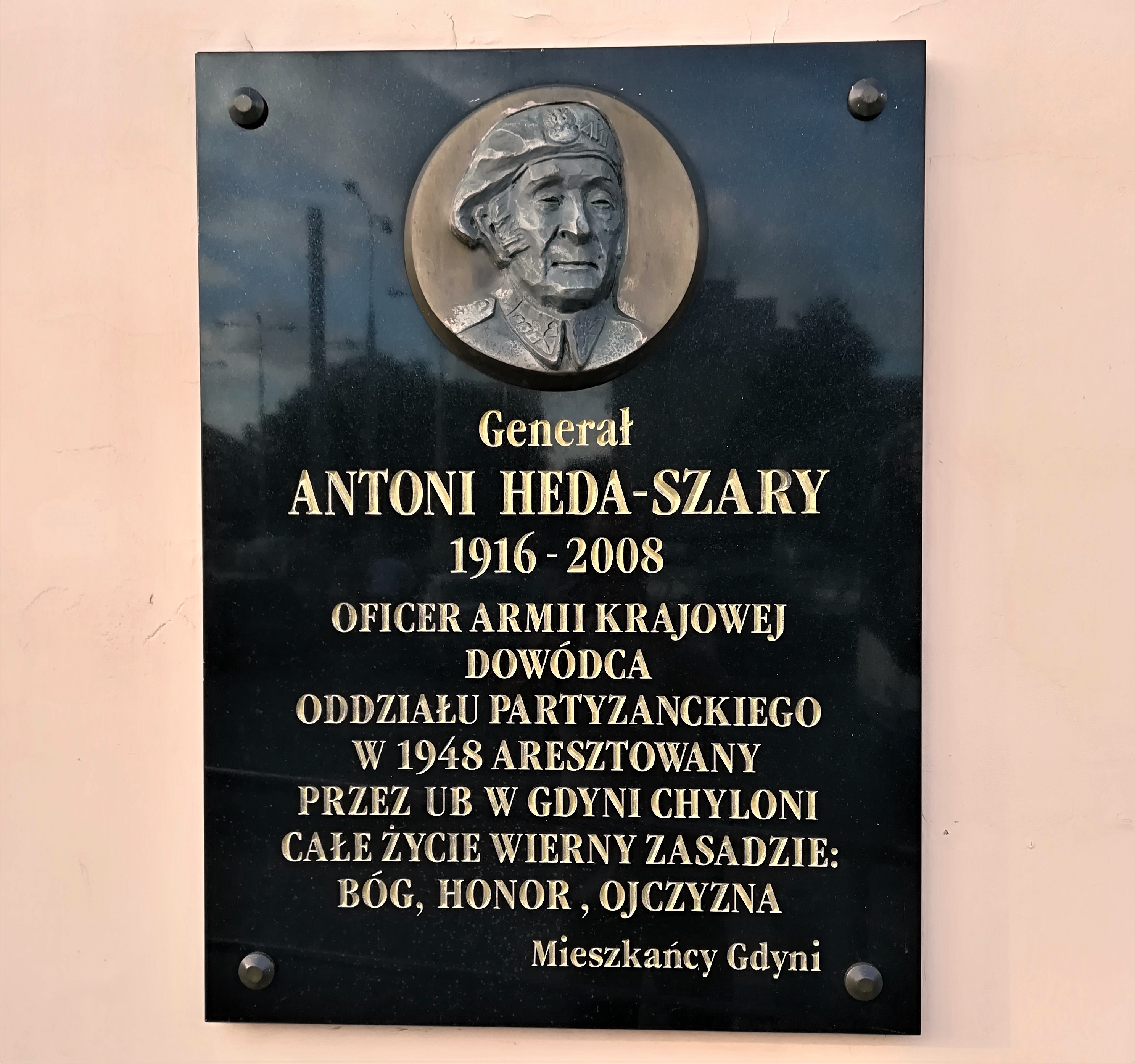
Memorial plaque to General Antoni Heda

== Modernisation ==
The platforms used by PR services were modernised in 2014.

== Train services ==
The station is served by the following services:

- Regional services (R) Tczew — Gdynia Chylonia
- Regional services (R) Tczew — Słupsk
- Regional services (R) Malbork — Słupsk
- Regional services (R) Malbork — Gdynia Chylonia
- Regional services (R) Elbląg — Gdynia Chylonia
- Regional services (R) Elbląg — Słupsk
- Regional services (R) Gdynia Chylonia — Olsztyn Główny
- Regional services (R) Gdynia Chylonia — Smętowo
- Regional services (R) Gdynia Chylonia — Laskowice Pomorskie
- Regional services (R) Gdynia Chylonia — Bydgoszcz Główna
- Regional services (R) Słupsk — Bydgoszcz Główna
- Regional services (R) Gdynia Chylonia — Pruszcz Gdański
- Regional services (R) Władysławowo - Reda - Gdynia Główna
- Regional services (R) Hel - Władysławowo - Reda - Gdynia Główna
- Regional services (R) Luzino — Gdynia Główna
- Regional services (R) Słupsk — Gdynia Główna
- Pomorska Kolej Metropolitalna services (R) Gdynia Główna — Gdańsk Osowa — Gdańsk Port Lotniczy (Airport) — Gdańsk Wrzeszcz
- Szybka Kolej Miejska services (SKM) (Lębork -) Wejherowo - Reda - Rumia - Gdynia - Sopot - Gdansk

| Preceding station | Polregio | Following station |
|---|---|---|
| Terminus | PR (Tczew) | Gdynia Główna towards Tczew |
| Rumia towards Słupsk | PR (Tczew) | Gdynia Główna towards Tczew |
| Terminus | PR (Malbork) | Gdynia Główna towards Malbork |
| Rumia towards Słupsk | PR (Malbork) | Gdynia Główna towards Malbork |
| Terminus | PR (Elbląg) | Gdynia Główna towards Elbląg |
| Rumia towards Słupsk | PR (Elbląg) | Gdynia Główna towards Elbląg |
| Terminus | PR (Smętowo/Laskowice Pomorskie/Bydgoszcz Główna) | Gdynia Główna towards Smętowo, Laskowice Pomorskie, or Bydgoszcz Główna |
| Rumia towards Słupsk | PR (Smętowo/Laskowice Pomorskie/Bydgoszcz Główna) | Gdynia Główna towards Smętowo, Laskowice Pomorskie, or Bydgoszcz Główna |
| Terminus | PR | Gdynia Główna towards Olsztyn Główny |
| Terminus | PR | Gdynia Główna towards Pruszcz Gdański |
| Rumia towards Luzino or Słupsk | PR | Gdynia Główna Terminus |
| Rumia towards Władysławowo or Hel | PR | Gdynia Główna Terminus |
| Preceding station | SKM Tricity | Following station |
| Gdynia Cisowa towards Wejherowo or Lębork | SKM Tricity | Gdynia Leszczynki towards Gdańsk Śródmieście |
