= Gdańsk Lech Wałęsa Airport =

International airport in Gdańsk, Poland

Gdańsk Lech Wałęsa Airport Port Lotniczy Gdańsk im. Lecha Wałęsy

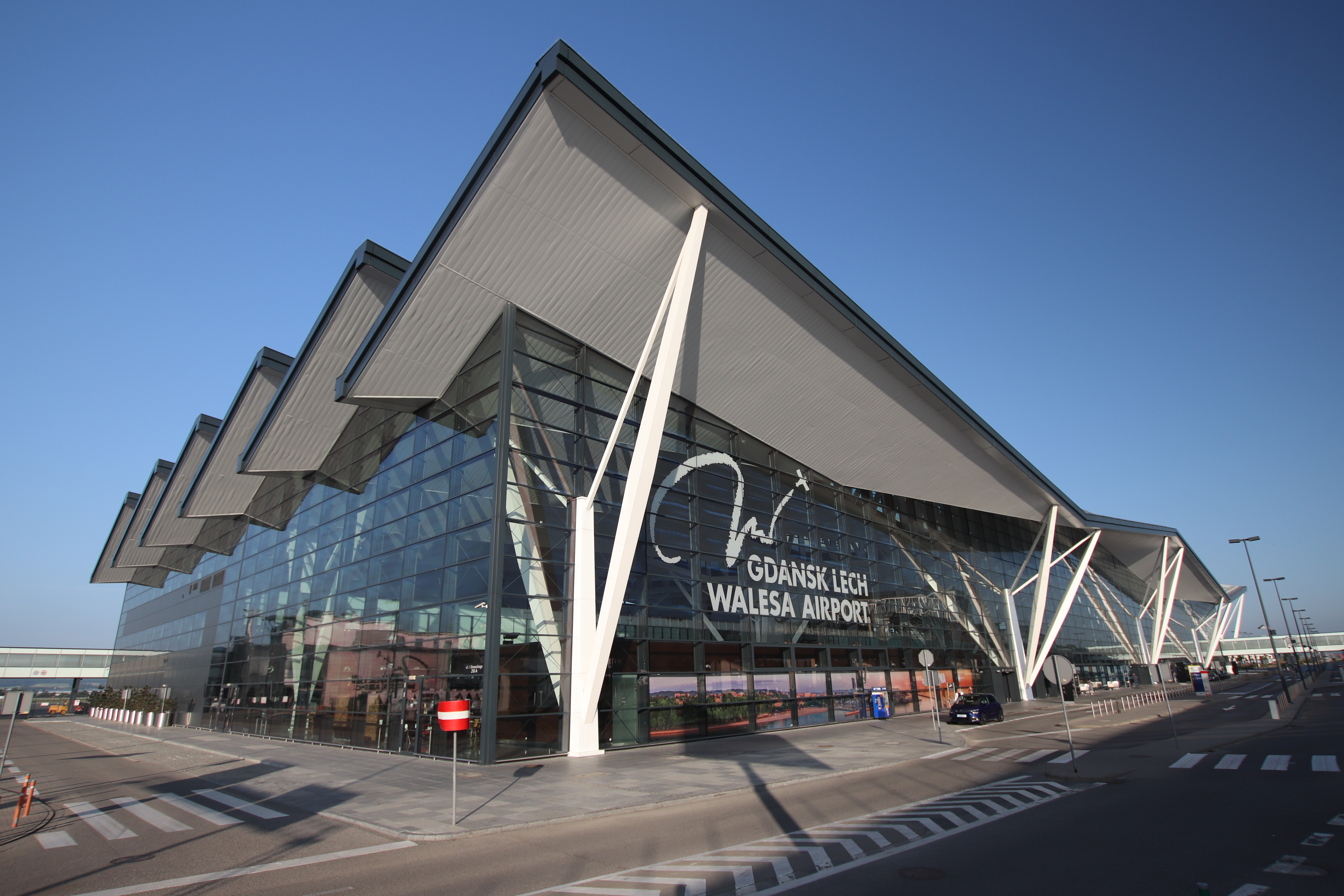
- IATA: GDN; ICAO: EPGD

Summary
- Airport type: Public
- Owner/Operator: Port Lotniczy Gdańsk Spółka z.o.o.
- Serves: Tricity, Poland
- Elevation AMSL: 149 m (489 ft)
- Coordinates: 54°22′39″N 018°27′58″E
- Website: www.airport.gdansk.pl

Map
- Location of airport in Poland

Runways
Direction	Length		Surface
Direction	m	ft	Surface
11/29	2,800	9,186	Asphalt/Concrete

Statistics (2025)
- Passengers served: 7,393,016 ▲
- Aircraft Movements: 61,554 ▲
- Source: Polish AIP at EUROCONTROL Statistics: Airport site

Gdańsk Lech Wałęsa Airport (Polish: Port Lotniczy Gdańsk im. Lecha Wałęsy, formerly Polish: Port Lotniczy Gdańsk-Rębiechowo) (IATA: GDN, ICAO: EPGD) is an international airport located 12 km (7.5 mi) northwest of Gdańsk, Poland, not far from the city centres of the Tricity metropolitan area: Gdańsk (12 km (7.5 mi)), Sopot (10 km (6.2 mi)) and Gdynia (23 km (14 mi)). Since 2004, the airport has been named after Lech Wałęsa, the president of Poland from 1990 to 1995. With 7.4 million passengers served in 2025, it is the third busiest airport in Poland in terms of passenger traffic, behind Warsaw Chopin Airport and Kraków John Paul II International Airport. It is also the seventy-fourth busiest airport in Europe.

== History ==
=== Early years (1910s–1950s) ===
The first passenger flights in Gdańsk were operated in the year 1919 from an airfield in the Langfuhr district of the Free City of Danzig (now the Wrzeszcz district of Gdańsk). It was possible thanks to a transformation of that military location into a civilian facility. The airport was at that time additionally used for airmail services and by the police. In the next years, the airport continued acquisitions of further areas which allowed it to expand and invest in modern infrastructure. The technical development of Gdansk Wrzeszcz Airport (Danzig-Langfuhr Airport) was followed by the launching of regular routes to Warsaw, Berlin, Moscow, Königsberg and other important cities of the region. The flights were operated by numerous international aviation companies.

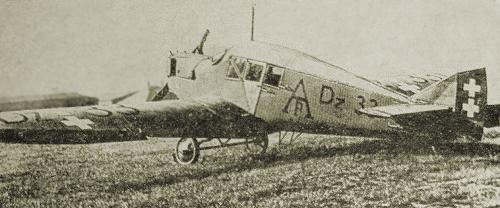
A Junkers F.13 at Danzig-Langfuhr in 1921.

The first Polish route was served between Gdańsk, Warsaw and Lviv by Aerolloyd beginning in September 1922. The company initially used Junkers F.13 aircraft on that route. This domestic service was the beginning of the company which later became LOT Polish Airlines, which is still Poland's national carrier.

=== New location since 1970s ===
As the airport facilities became outdated at the end of the 1960s (including runway lights which forced airport authorities to impose a ban on overnight flights), a new location near the village of Rębiechowo was chosen. The airport had to be built somewhere else also because of further urban development. New areas were needed in order to make it possible for the public investors to construct new buildings for the growing population of Gdańsk. Furthermore, a new, longer runway was necessary in order to allow larger jet airliners to take off and land safely as the era of modern jet aircraft began. The old airport in Wrzeszcz was officially closed on 1 May 1974, and a large housing estate was built on its grounds. Nowadays, only a few remaining elements of the old Wrzeszcz airport infrastructure can be found, including remnants of its main north–south oriented runway in what is now the Zaspa district.

After the closure of the old airport, the new one was built, and it opened in 1974 near the village of Rębiechowo (on westernmost land incorporated into the Gdańsk borough of Matarnia in 1973). The airport acquired its current name in 2004. There was some controversy as to whether the name should be spelled Lech Walesa (without diacritics, but better recognisable in the world) or Lech Wałęsa (with Polish letters, but difficult to write and pronounce for foreigners, the closest English phonetic approximation being "Vawensa").

Since 1993, Gdańsk Airport has been owned 31.45% by the authorities of Pomeranian Voivodeship, 29.45% by the city of Gdańsk, 1.14% by the city of Gdynia, 0.35% by the city of Sopot and 37.61% by Polish Airports State Enterprise. In 2006, the airport served for the first time in its history more than 1 million passengers per year. In 2010, the passengers numbers exceeded 2 million. After the construction of a new modern passenger terminal with extended capacities (the opening took place in April 2012 ahead of the UEFA Euro 2012 football championships), the airport continued its development and it served for the first time over 3 million passengers in a single year in 2014. In summer 2015, airlines flying to and from the airport served over 50 regular routes as well as charter and cargo flights.

== Airport infrastructure ==
=== Airside facilities ===
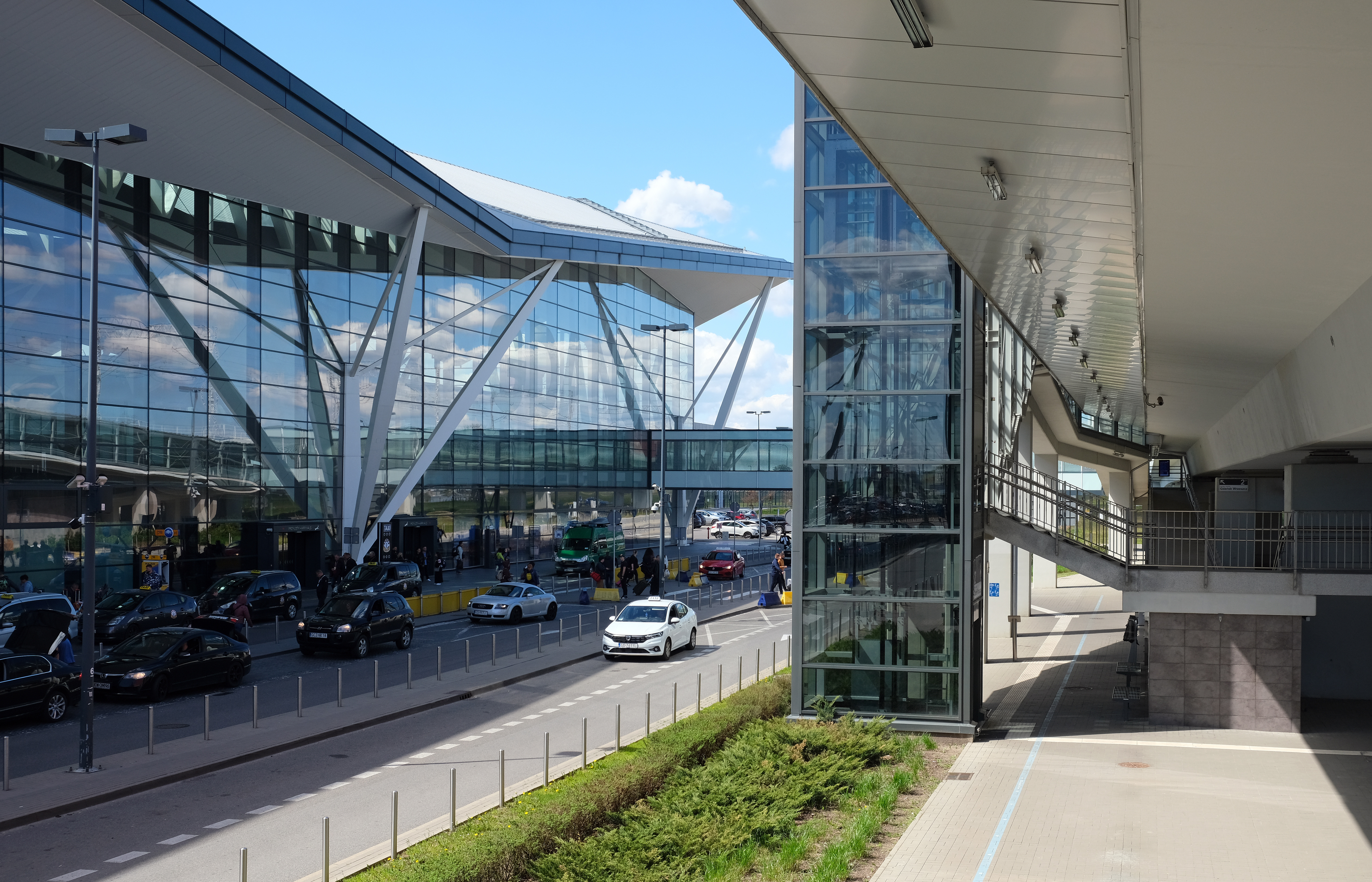
Gdańsk Lech Wałęsa Airport exterior in 2023.

Gdańsk Lech Wałęsa Airport has a single asphalt-concrete runway in the direction of 11/29. The runway is 2,800 m (9,200 ft) long and equipped with a modern ILS CAT IIIb allowing aircraft to land in foggy weather. The decision height established for the approach system in Gdańsk is 30 m (98 ft), whereas the visibility minimum for pilots varies from 125 m (410 ft) to 300 m (980 ft), the higher value being required in the initial one-third of the runway's length. In addition, the navigation facilities at the airport are supplemented with a modern wide area multilateration system.

The runway as well as taxiways are equipped with light aids system using LED technology. The lighting of the runway can be remotely controlled from the flight control tower. The runway has eight exit taxiways leading to five parking aprons where up to 18 middle-sized aircraft (e.g. Boeing 737 or Airbus A321) can be parked. The airport also has an extra apron used in winter for de-icing of aircraft. The deicing pad has been constructed in a way which allows keeping up ecological standards.

=== Passenger terminals ===
==== Terminal 1 ====
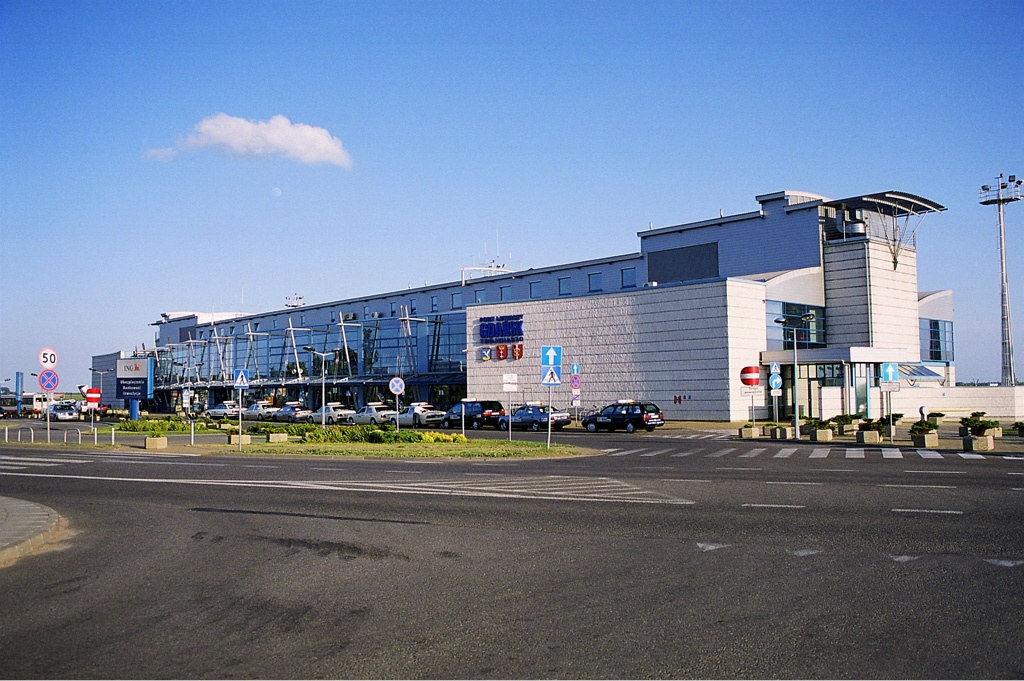
The former terminal building in 2003

Terminal T1 was inaugurated in 1997 and has primarily served passengers flying to countries outside the Schengen Area in recent years. The facility covers an area of 9,662 square meters. Terminal 1 is currently not operational for passenger services and it is planned to be demolished as soon as the Terminal 2 expansion works begin in the next years.

==== Terminal 2 ====
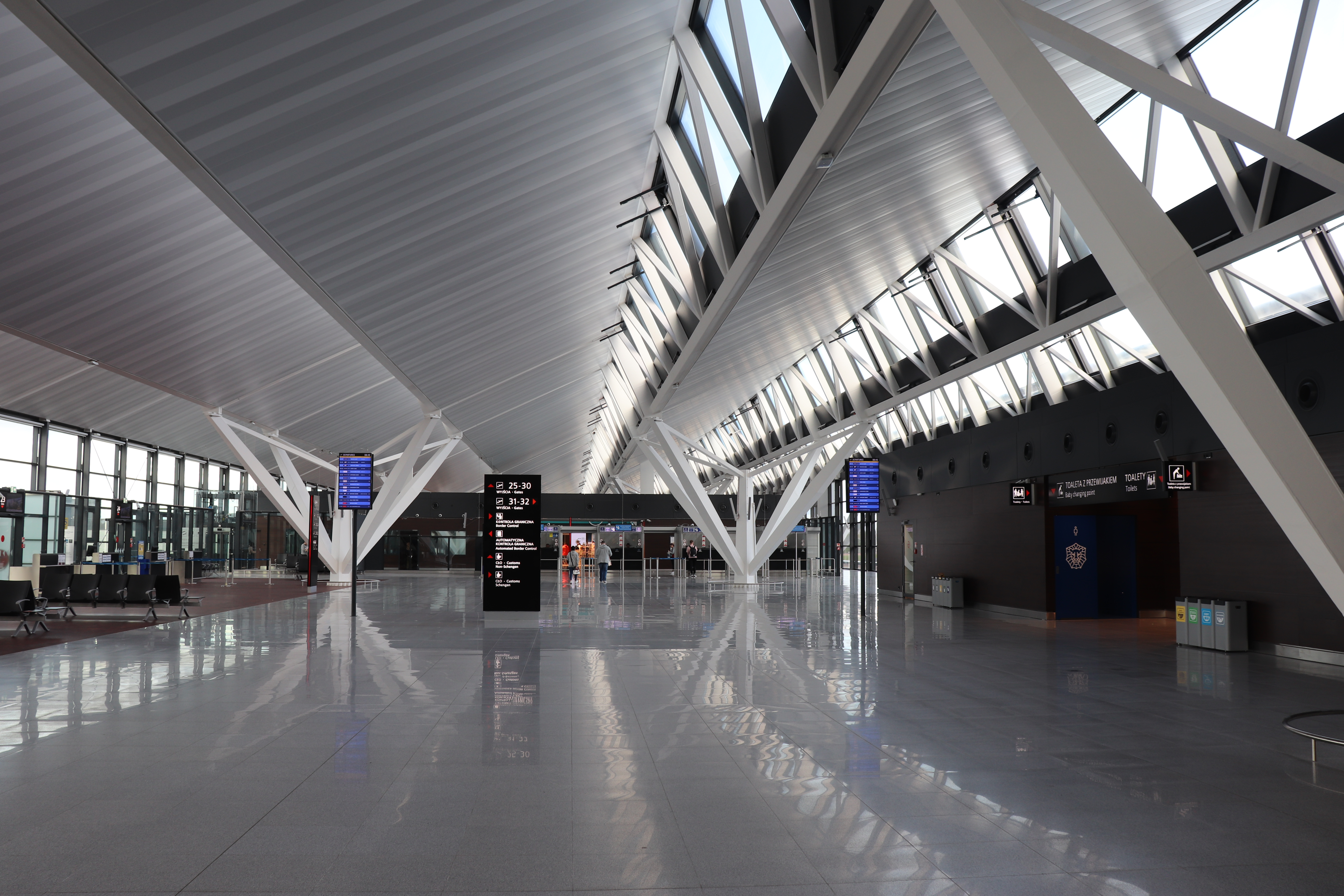
Terminal interior

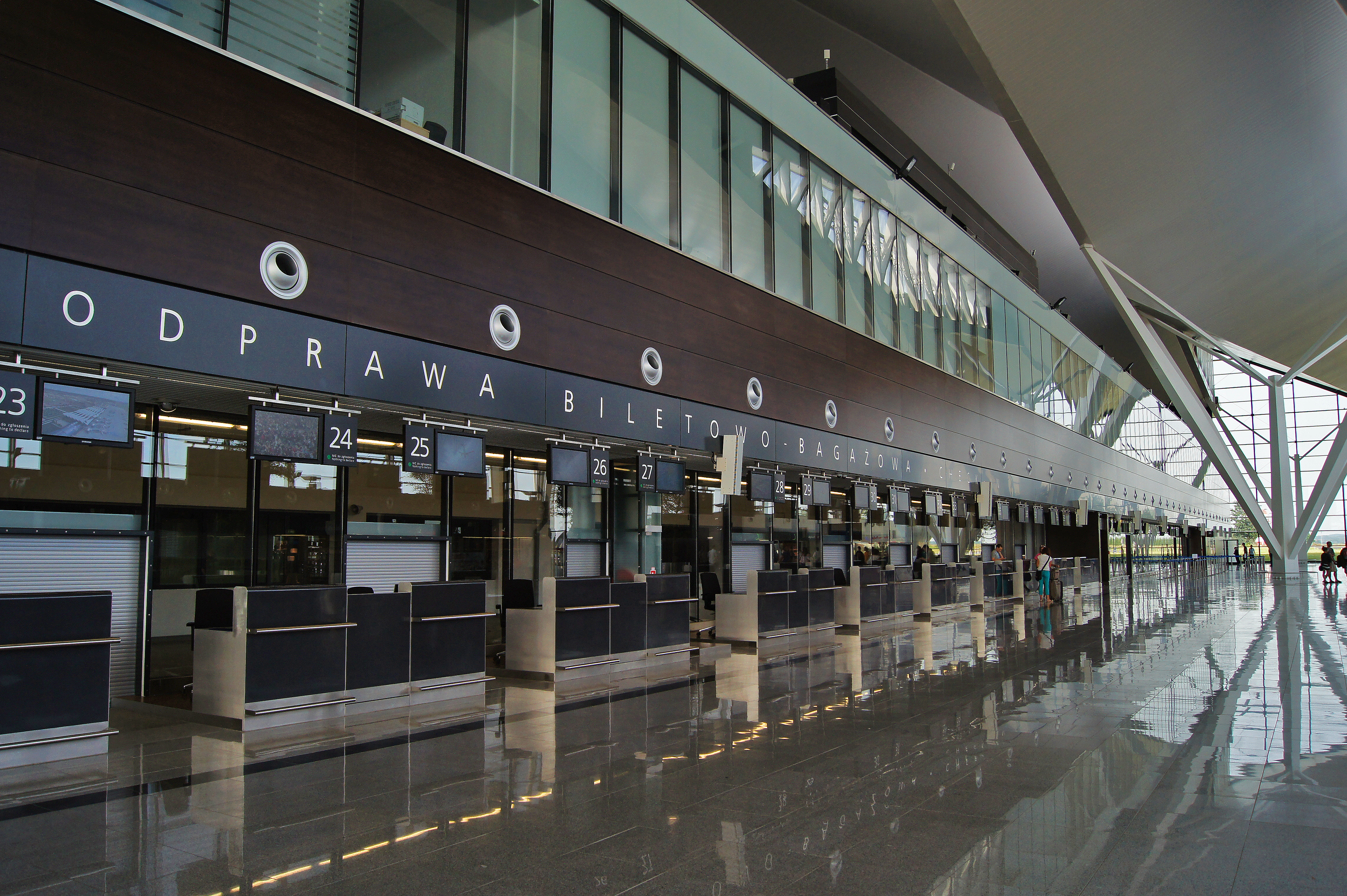
Terminal interior

The first part of passenger terminal T2 was constructed in 2012, ahead of the UEFA European Football Championship held in Poland and Ukraine. At that time, Terminal T2 had a usable area of 39,433 square metres, catering mainly to departing passengers to Schengen countries. The new terminal was built to the west of the existing terminal T1, parallel to the proposed access road and the existing runway. This building was designed as a hall housing two functional zones - those related to the airport apron (airside) - baggage sorting and waiting areas, as well as zones related to the city side (landside) - ticket and baggage check-in halls (departures), airline offices, dining facilities, and services. The terminal has three above-ground floors and one underground floor. The terminals are connected by a connector at the first-floor level. The terminal was designed in such a way that it could be modularly expanded in subsequent stages, if necessary. An intermediate floor - a corridor for arrivals - had been planned on the aircraft parking apron side. On the apron side, four external staircases were designed on the forecourt of the terminal. The implementation of this project doubled the passenger capacity of Gdańsk Airport, from 2.5 to 5 million passengers annually.

From 2014 to 2015, Terminal T2 underwent expansion, increasing its total area by 5,512 square meters and its usable area by 15,537 square meters. The new part housed the arrivals zone.

Between 2019 and 2022, Gdańsk Airport expanded Terminal T2 with a new western pier, adding 16,000 square meters of usable space. Functionally, it extends Terminal T2 by an additional 180 meters and is 46 meters wide. Structurally, it is a completely separate facility. On the ground floor of the pier, an expanded baggage claim hall has been implemented, where ultimately nine baggage system belts can be installed, along with an extended area for arrival baggage handling, a passport control zone equipped with six document control points for arriving passengers from Non-Schengen and third countries, and communication space to gates for Schengen, Non-Schengen, and third-country flights, along with accompanying facilities: service rooms, airport service areas, technical rooms, and restrooms. On the northern side of the pier, a driveway for buses to two bus gates has been constructed, allowing direct access from the airport apron to the first-floor level.

On the first floor, a departure hall with three dual jet bridges for non-Schengen flights and one for Schengen flights was constructed. Rooms for the Border Guard, Customs Office, and airport services were established. The spatial layout of the hall serves as an extension of the existing terminal T2 hall.

The distinctive multi-level roofing structure and steel framework, constituting a unique feature and recognizable symbol of the Gdańsk Airport, serve as the primary reference point for the design of the new western pier.

The airport offers nine jet bridges, which directly connect passengers to airplanes. As of 2024, these are the only passenger boarding bridges in Poland that are also compatible with turboprop aircraft such as the Bombardier Q400.

Upon arrival in Gdańsk, rental cars are available from several car rental companies. From Terminal T2, passengers can directly access the platforms of the Pomeranian Metropolitan Railway.

== Airlines and destinations ==
=== Passenger ===
Airlines	Destinations
Enter Air	Charter: Hurghada; Seasonal charter: Antalya, Burgas, Enfidha, Girona, Kos, Tirana, Varna
Eurowings	Seasonal: Düsseldorf
Finnair	Helsinki
Icelandair	Seasonal: Reykjavík–Keflavík
Jet2.com	Seasonal: Birmingham, East Midlands (begins 27 November 2026), London–Gatwick (begins 27 November 2026), Manchester, Newcastle upon Tyne
KLM	Amsterdam
LOT Polish Airlines	Brussels, Istanbul, Paris–Orly (begins 5 April 2027), Warsaw–Chopin; Seasonal: Kraków, Rzeszów
Lufthansa	Frankfurt
Norwegian Air Shuttle	Bergen, Oslo
Ryanair	Alicante, Aarhus, Barcelona, Beauvais, Belfast–International, Bergamo, Bratislava, Brindisi, Bristol, Bucharest–Otopeni, Budapest, Catania, Copenhagen, Dublin, Edinburgh, Gothenburg, Hamburg, Kraków, Leeds/Bradford, London–Stansted, Lublin, Madrid, Málaga, Malta, Manchester, Milan-Malpensa, Newcastle upon Tyne, Paphos, Pisa, Podgorica, Prague, Rome–Fiumicino, Sandefjord, Skellefteå, Stockholm–Arlanda, Tirana, Treviso, Wrocław; Seasonal: Burgas, Chania, Corfu, Dubrovnik, Naples, Palermo, Santorini, Turin (begins 19 December 2026) Växjö, Zadar
Scandinavian Airlines	Copenhagen
SkyUp	Charter: Hurghada, Sharm El Sheikh
Smartwings Poland	Seasonal charter: Bodrum, Dalaman, Podgorica
Swiss International Air Lines	Seasonal: Zürich
Wizz Air	Aberdeen, Ålesund, Alicante, Athens, Barcelona, Bergen, Billund, Bucharest–Otopeni, Budapest, Catania, Copenhagen, Dortmund, Eindhoven, Funchal, Gothenburg, Hamburg, Haugesund, Larnaca, London–Luton, Madrid, Málaga, Marsa Alam, Milan–Malpensa, Nice, Oslo, Podgorica, Reykjavík–Keflavík, Rome–Fiumicino, Sandefjord, Sharm El Sheikh, Stavanger, Stockholm–Arlanda, Tallinn, Tenerife–South, Tromsø, Trondheim, Turku, Vilnius; Seasonal: Burgas, Dubrovnik, Poprad–Tatry, Palma de Mallorca, Rijeka, Split, Tirana Turin (begins 16 January 2027), Varna

=== Cargo ===
Airlines	Destinations
DHL Aviation	Leipzig/Halle, Tallinn
FedEx Feeder	Katowice, Paris–Charles de Gaulle
UPS Airlines	Berlin

== Statistics ==
=== Routes ===
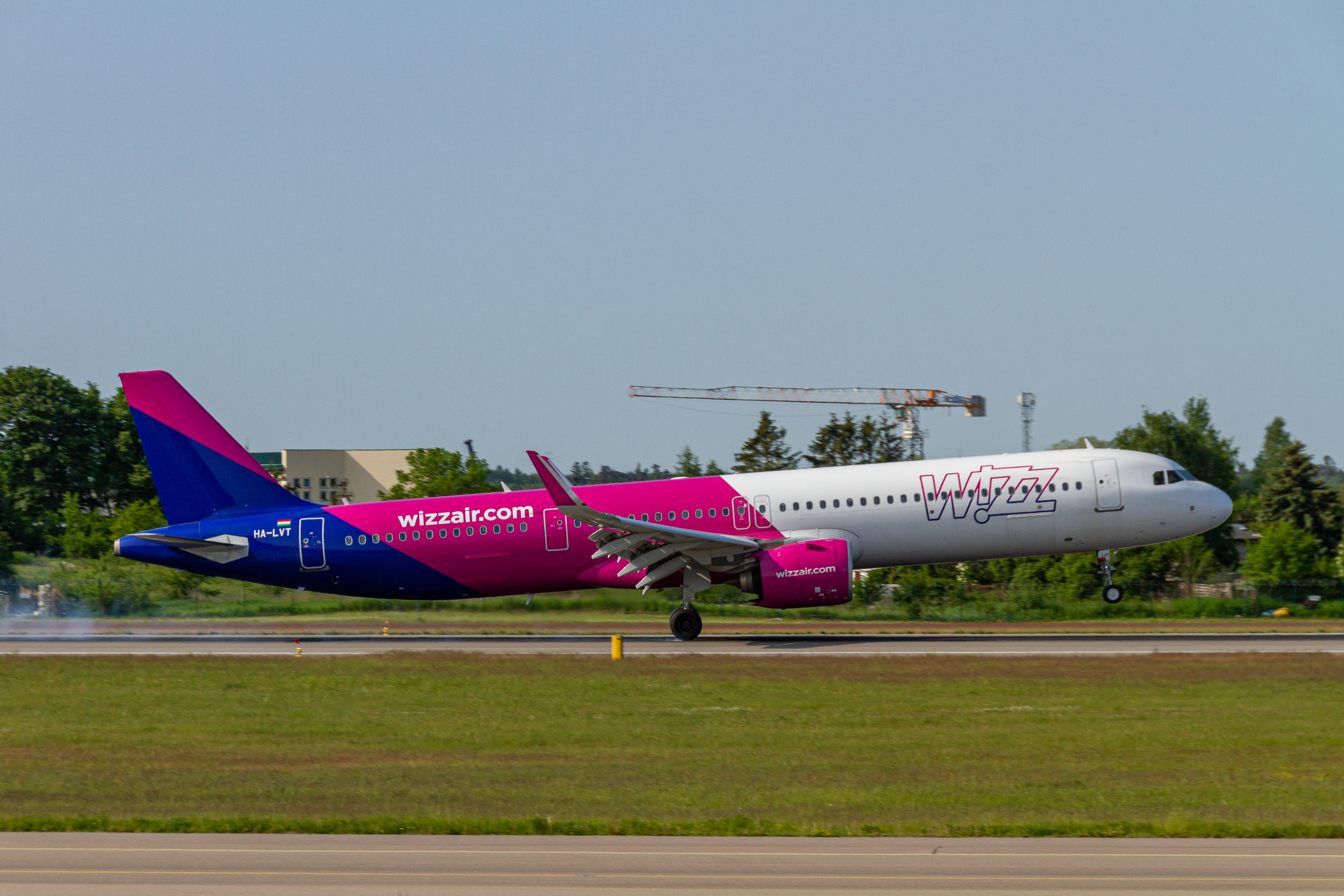
Wizz Air Airbus A321neo aircraft at Gdansk Airport

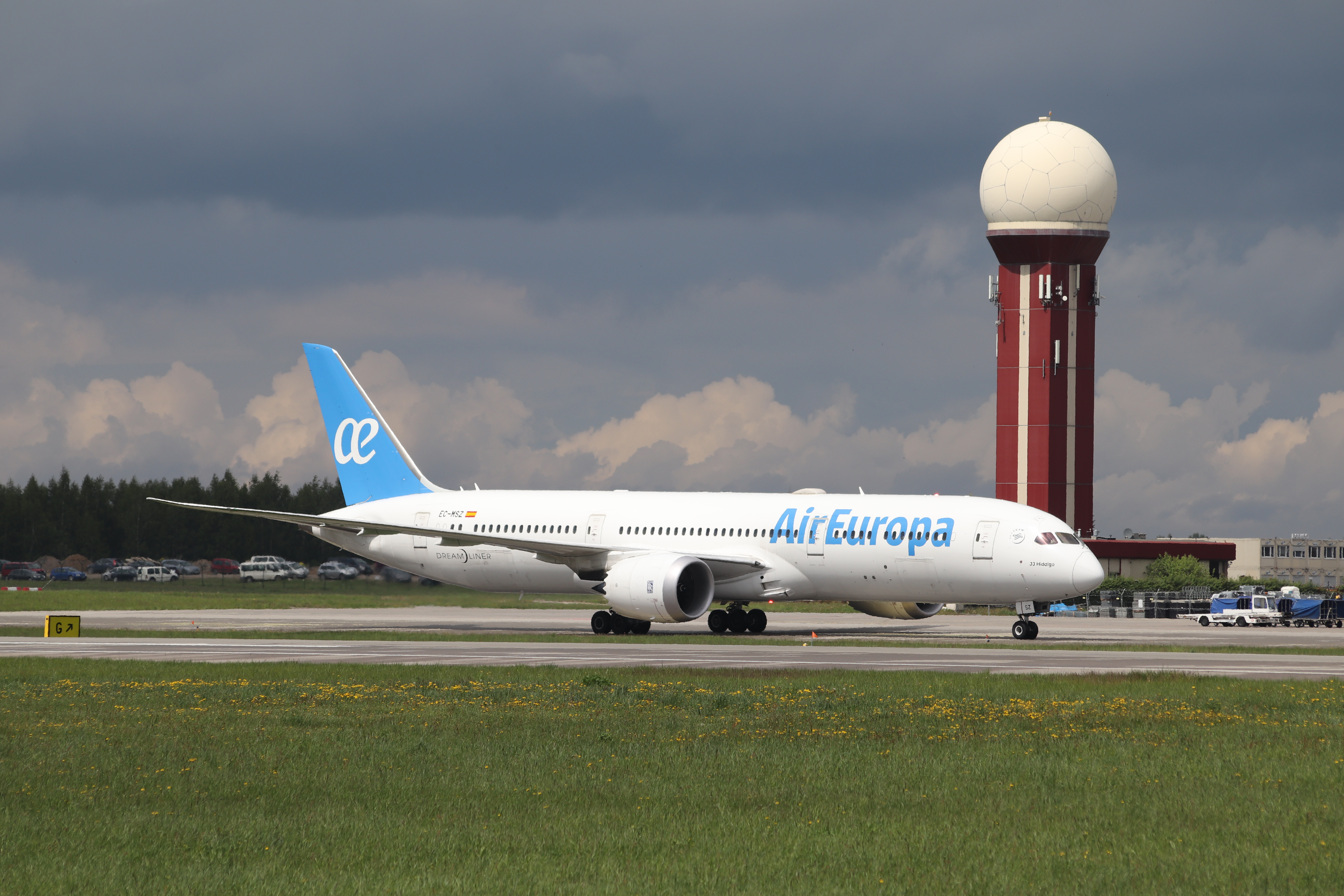
Air Europa Boeing 787 aircraft visiting Gdansk Airport in 2021

Busiest routes from Gdańsk Airport (2024)
Rank	Airport	Passengers	Change 2023 / 24
1.	Copenhagen (CPH)	391,607	▲62,0%
2.	Stockholm-Arlanda (ARN)	345,188	▲53,1%
3.	Warsaw-Chopin (WAW)	285,701	▲2,9%
4.	London-Luton (LTN)	278,254	▲7,4%
5.	Oslo-Gardermoen (OSL)	265,767	▲23,5%
6.	London-Stansted (STN)	247,580	▼0,9%
7.	Amsterdam (AMS)	218,560	▲32,6%
8.	Sandefjord (TRF)	211,574	▼7,5%
9.	Antalya (AYT)	195,603	▲15,2%
10.	Hamburg (HAM)	180,734	▲18,3%
11.	Bergen (BGO)	176,511	▲15,1%
12.	Dortmund (DTM)	158,692	▲19,8%
13.	Stavanger (SVG)	147,880	▲15,0%
14.	Alicante (ALC)	139,149	▲140,5%
15.	Frankfurt (FRA)	138,826	▲18,7%
16.	Munich (MUC)	137,287	▲33,4%
17.	Barcelona–El Prat (BCN)	135,250	▲56,1%
18.	Gothenburg (GOT)	135,110	▼1,4%
19.	Eindhoven (EIN)	133,236	▲2,4%
20.	Málaga (AGP)	106,601	▲25,4%

=== Traffic ===
Year	Passengers		Cargo (t)	Flight operations
Year	Numbers	% change	Cargo (t)	Flight operations
1999	249,913		1,472	10,512
2000	269,960	▲8.0%	▲1,552	▲11,586
2001	319,174	▲18.2%	▲1,953	▲14,052
2002	318,033	▼0.4%	▲2,211	▼13,450
2003	365,036	▲14.8%	▲2,686	▲14,346
2004	463,840	▲27.1%	▲2,742	▲17,500
2005	677,946	▲46.2%	▲3,433	▲19,000
2006	1,249,780	▲84.3%	▲4,037	▲24,200
2007	1,708,739	▲36.7%	▲4,757	▲28,200
2008	1,954,166	▲14.4%	▼4,610	▲31,000
2009	1,890,925	▼3.2%	▼4,067	▼30,000
2010	2,232,590	▲18.1%	▲4,487	▲32,000
2011	2,483,000	▲11.2%	▲4,943	▲34,360
2012	2,906,000	▲17.0%	▼4,851	▲37,022
2013	2,843,737	▼2.1%	▲4,918	▲42,041
2014	3,288,180	▲15.6%	▲5,658	▼39,974
2015	3,706,108	▲12.7%	▼5,162	▲40,261
2016	4,004,081	▲8.0%	▼4,863	▲41,079
2017	4,611,714	▲15.0%	▲5,500	▲43,422
2018	4,980,647	▲8.0%	▲6,213	▲46,482
2019	5,376,120	▲7.9%	▲6,887	▲48,882
2020	1,711,281	▼68.2%	▲7,028	▼25,558
2021	2,154,563	▲25.9%	▲9,171	▲29,298
2022	4,576,705	▲112.9%	▲10,189	▲43,987
2023	5,907,280	▲22.5%	▲11,483	▲49,502
2024	6,714,149	▲13.7%	▲11,681	▲56,839
2025	7,393,016	▲10.1%	▼10,726	▲61,554

=== Airlines ===
Passenger airlines operating on regular routes from GDN (2015–2025): Numbers of passengers
Airline	2025	2024	2023	2022	2021	2020	2019	2018	2017	2016	2015
Wizz Air	2,970,545 ▲	2,745,300 ▲	2,337,023 ▲	1,658,135 ▲	797,797 ▼	813,244 ▼	2,460,163 ▲	2,259,969 ▲	2,037,832 ▲	1,862,137 ▲	1,772,840
Ryanair	2,493,376 ▲	2,138,000 ▼	2,144,934 ▲	1,733,101 ▲	702,598 ▲	442,698 ▼	1,262,600 ▲	1,194,672 ▼	1,312,084 ▲	1,026,016 ▲	820,590
LOT Polish Airlines	302,431 ▲	291,500 ▲	284,433 ▲	236,235 ▲	138,057 ▼	142,242 ▼	334,731 ▲	328,136 ▼	328,905 ▲	299,902 ▲	250,268
Lufthansa	288,989 ▲	273,300 ▲	219,806 ▲	176,990 ▲	80,103 ▲	63,976 ▼	267,812 ▼	273,326 ▲	246,301 ▼	270,349 ▼	277,245
KLM Royal Dutch Airlines	235,224 ▲	218,700 ▲	164,857 ▲	139,947 ▲	125,561 ▲	74,955 ▼	151,220 ▲	120,231 ▲	47,826 ▲	0	0
Scandinavian Airlines	194,900 ▲	170,000 ▲	144,146 ▲	102,292 ▲	34,270 ▼	53,423 ▼	213,133 ▼	213,384 ▼	219,827 ▲	199,351 ▲	164,628
Norwegian Air Shuttle	154,576 ▲	151,800 ▲	146,823 ▲	112,303 ▲	28,784 ▼	32,162 ▼	154,303 ▲	123,874 ▲	86,668 ▲	79,986 ▲	73,829
Finnair	40,324 ▲	36,400 ▲	0 ▼	23,797 ▲	1,812 ▼	4,964 ▼	60,301 ▲	51,538 ▲	33,131 ▲	31,099 ▲	21,563
Swiss International Air Lines	20,162 ▼	24,300 ▲	19,349 ▲	10,223 ▼	10,310	? ▼	22,885 ▲	0	0	0	0
Eurowings	13,441 ▼	18,221 ▲	14,415 ▲	14,191 ▲	6,656 ▲	5,196 ▼	6,518 ▲	0	0	0	0
Jet2.com	6,721 ▲	6,100 ▲	0	0	0	0	0	0	0	0	0
airBaltic	0	0	0	0	0 ▼	? ▼	7,243 ▲	0	0	0	0
easyJet	0	0	0	0	0	0 ▼	17,348 ▲	0	0	0	0
~~Air Berlin~~	-	-	-	-	-	-	-	-	17,891 ▲	15,239 ▼	69,156
~~Ukraine International Airlines~~	-	0	0	0	0	0	0	0	0	3,310 ▲	0

== Ground transportation ==
=== Rail ===
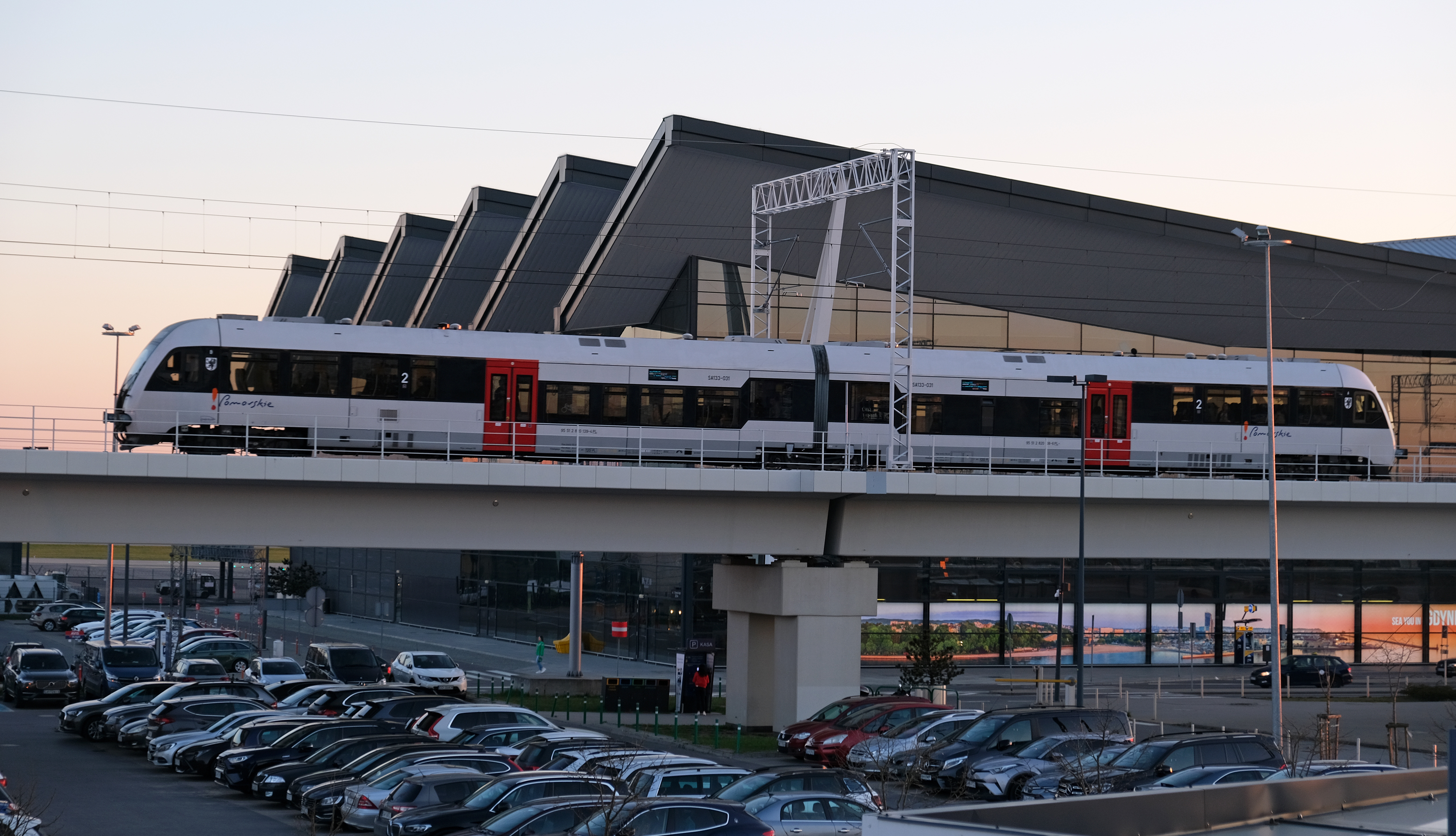
Passenger train departing from the station at Gdańsk Lech Wałęsa Airport

Pomorska Kolej Metropolitalna (PKM, the 'Pomeranian Metropolitan Railway) connects Gdańsk Lech Wałęsa Airport with Wrzeszcz, Gdynia Główna railway station and downtown Gdańsk. It connects to the Fast Urban Railway.

=== Bus ===
The airport has bus connections with Gdańsk-Centre, Gdańsk-Wrzeszcz railway station, Gdańsk-Łostowice and Sopot – Kamienny Potok railway station.

== See also ==
- List of airports in Poland
- Air ambulances in Poland
