= Gdańsk Śródmieście railway station =

Railway station in Gdańsk, Poland

Coordinates: 54.3473°N 18.6436°E

Gdańsk Śródmieście
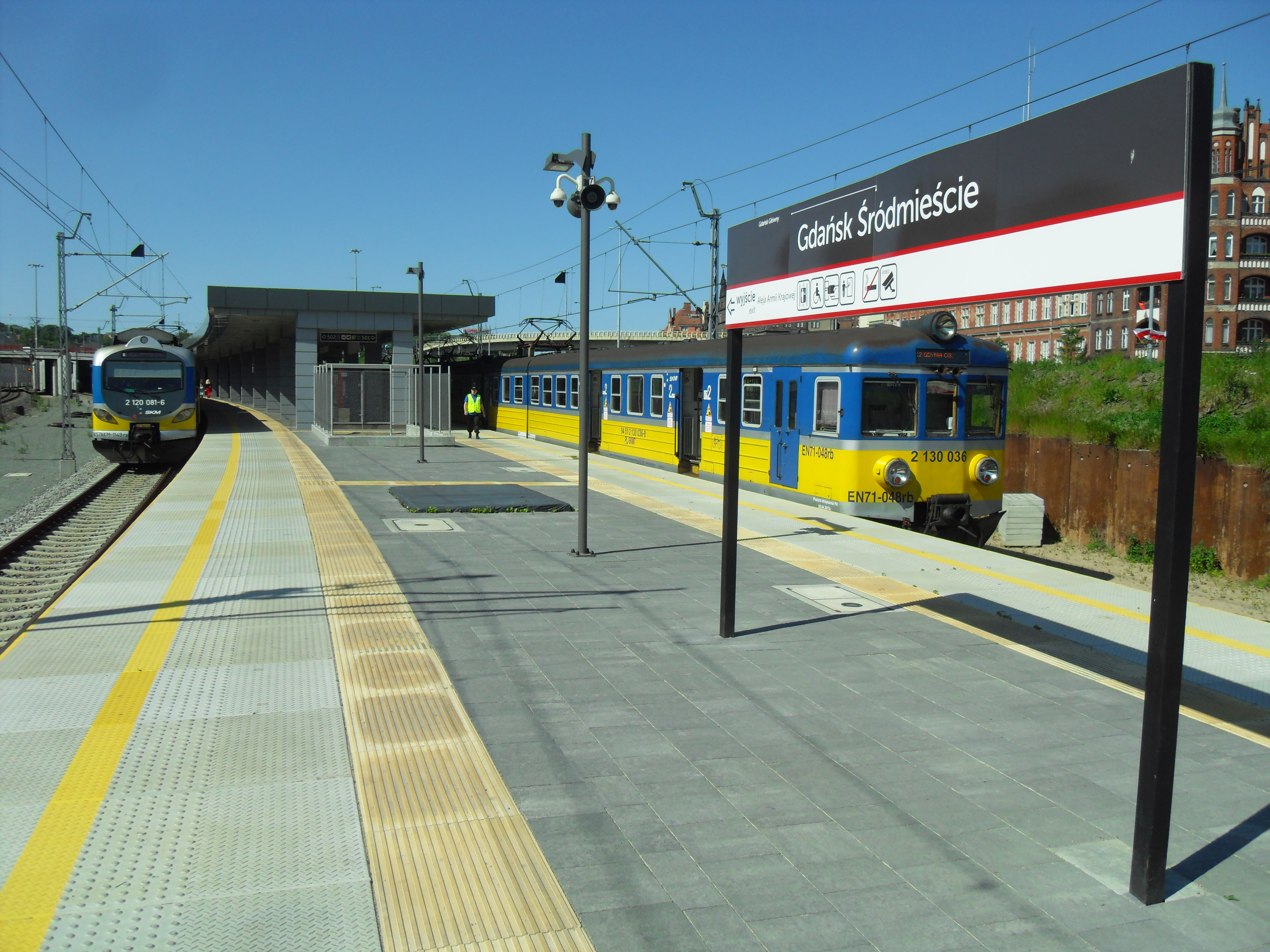

General information
- Location: Gdańsk, Pomeranian Voivodeship; Poland
- System: Railway Station
- Operator: SKM Tricity
- Line: 250: Gdańsk Śródmieście–Rumia railway
- Platforms: 2
- Tracks: 4

History
- Opened: 1 April 2015; 11 years ago
Location
- Location within Poland

Gdańsk Śródmieście railway station is a railway station serving the city of Gdańsk, in the Pomeranian Voivodeship, Poland. The station opened on 1 April 2015 and is located on the Gdańsk Śródmieście–Rumia railway. The train services are operated by SKM Tricity.

The station is an extension of the SKM Tricity train service from Gdansk main station and serves as a transport hub and as an interchange for train, tram and bus.

== History ==
A few hundred metres south of the station there used to be the station Gdańsk Biskupia Górka until the mid-1960s.

SKM Tricity aimed to open the station in the period 2008–2014. Originally it intended to have the station in use in time for Euro 2012, however this was not achieved as the contract for the construction work was not ready. This contract was signed on 31 July 2013. Two further deadlines were missed (mid-2014 and the start of 2015), with the station opening on 1 April 2015. The investment cost about 80 million zł. The project site was prepared in part simultaneously with the renovation of the Warsaw–Gdańsk railway.

Since April 2015, trains serve the new station. The trains between Gdynia, Gdańsk and Tczew do not stop at the station, as they use the Warsaw–Gdańsk railway which does not have a platform here.

== Train services ==
The station is served by the following services:

- Szybka Kolej Miejska services (SKM) (Lębork -) Wejherowo - Reda - Rumia - Gdynia - Sopot - Gdansk

Preceding station	SKM Tricity	Following station
Gdańsk Główny towards Wejherowo or Lębork	SKM Tricity	Terminus

== Public transport ==
The former tram stop Centrum was renamed Śródmieście SKM on 1 April 2015, to coincide with the opening of the station.

Tram: 2, 6, 7, 11

== Nearby landmarks ==
- Biskupia Górka
- National Museum, Gdańsk
- Forum Gdańsk
- Gdańsk Shakespeare Theatre
- Pentecostal Church in Gdańsk

== Gallery ==
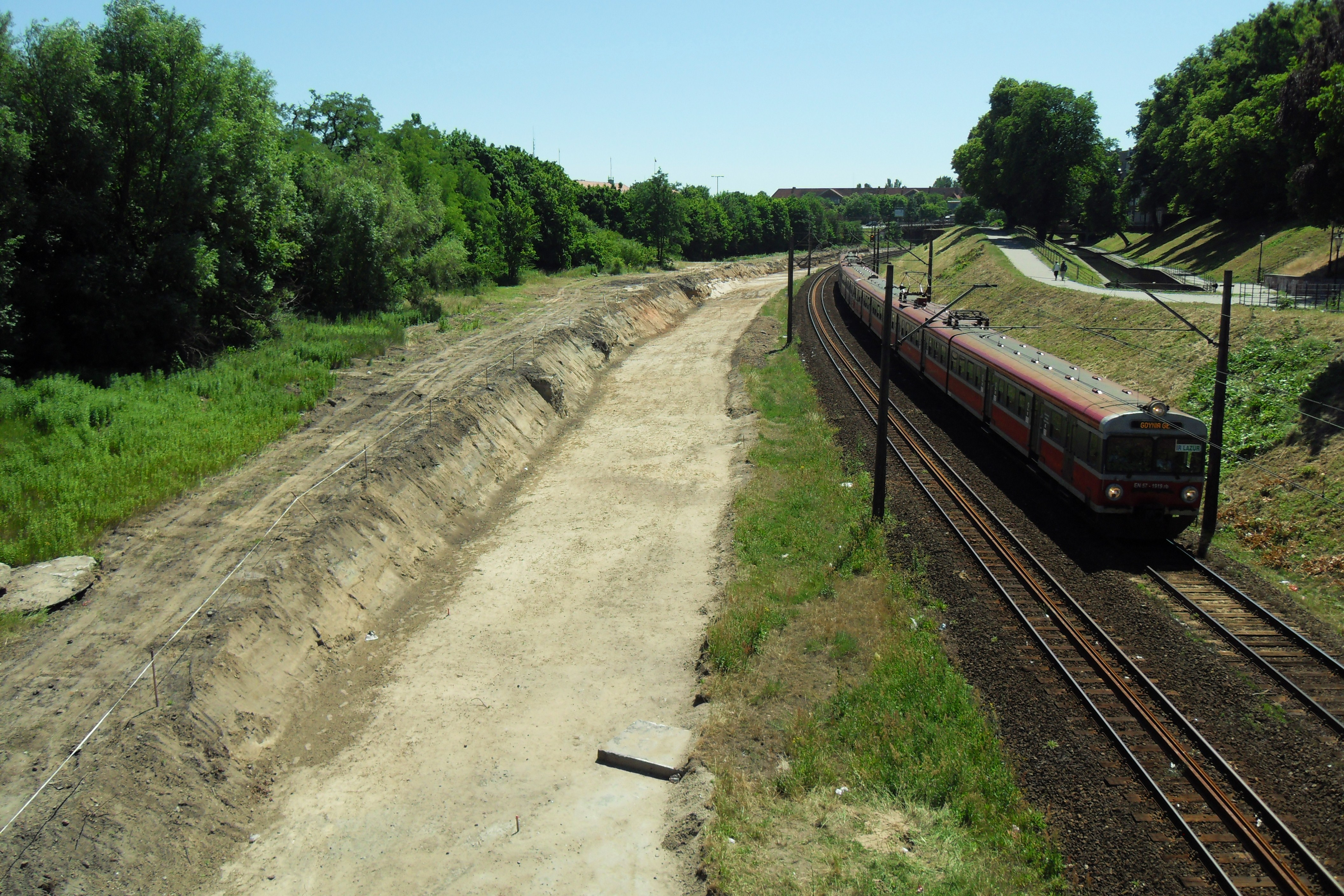
The site of the station in 2011, before construction took place.

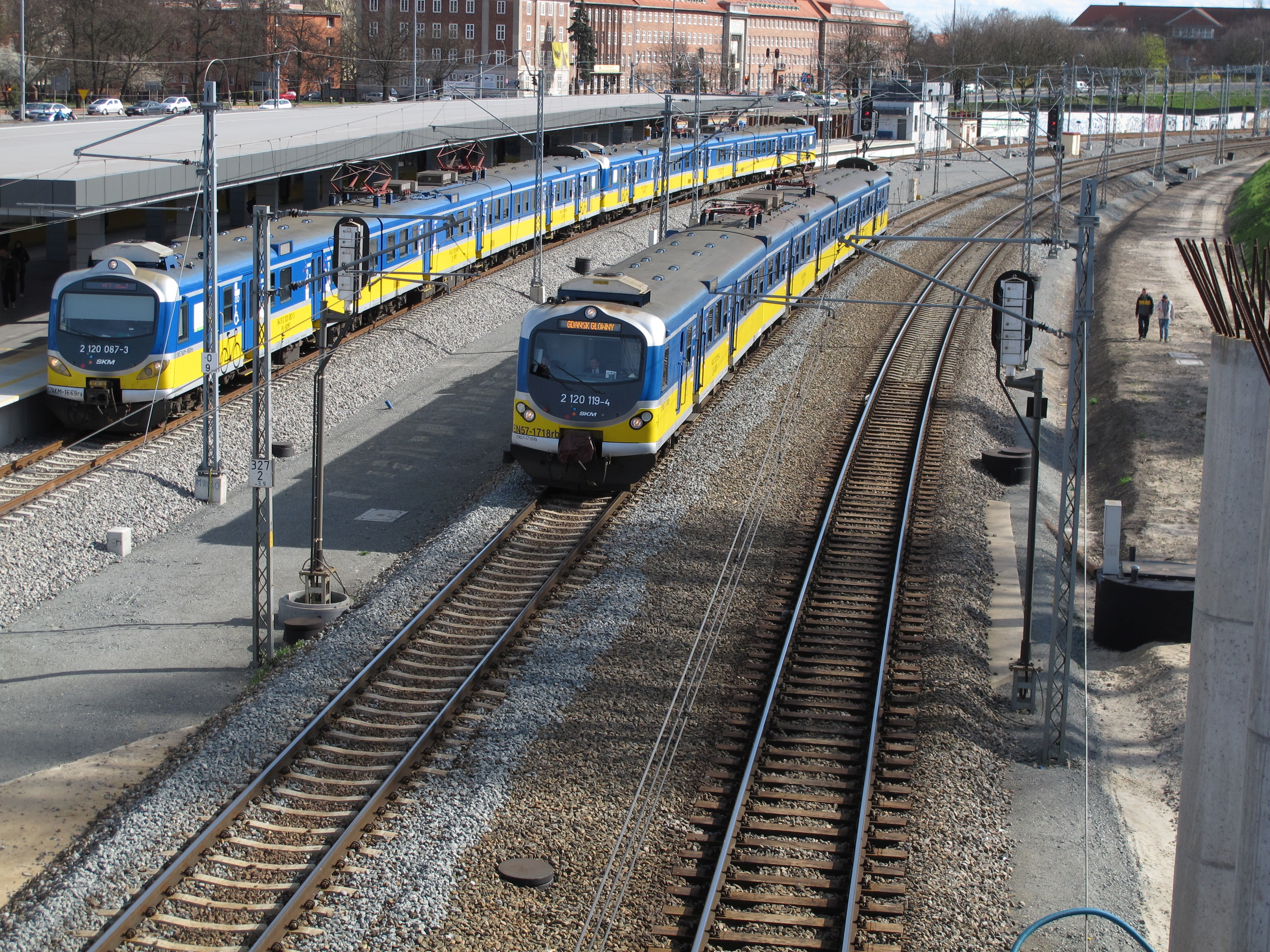
A train from Tczew passing the station.

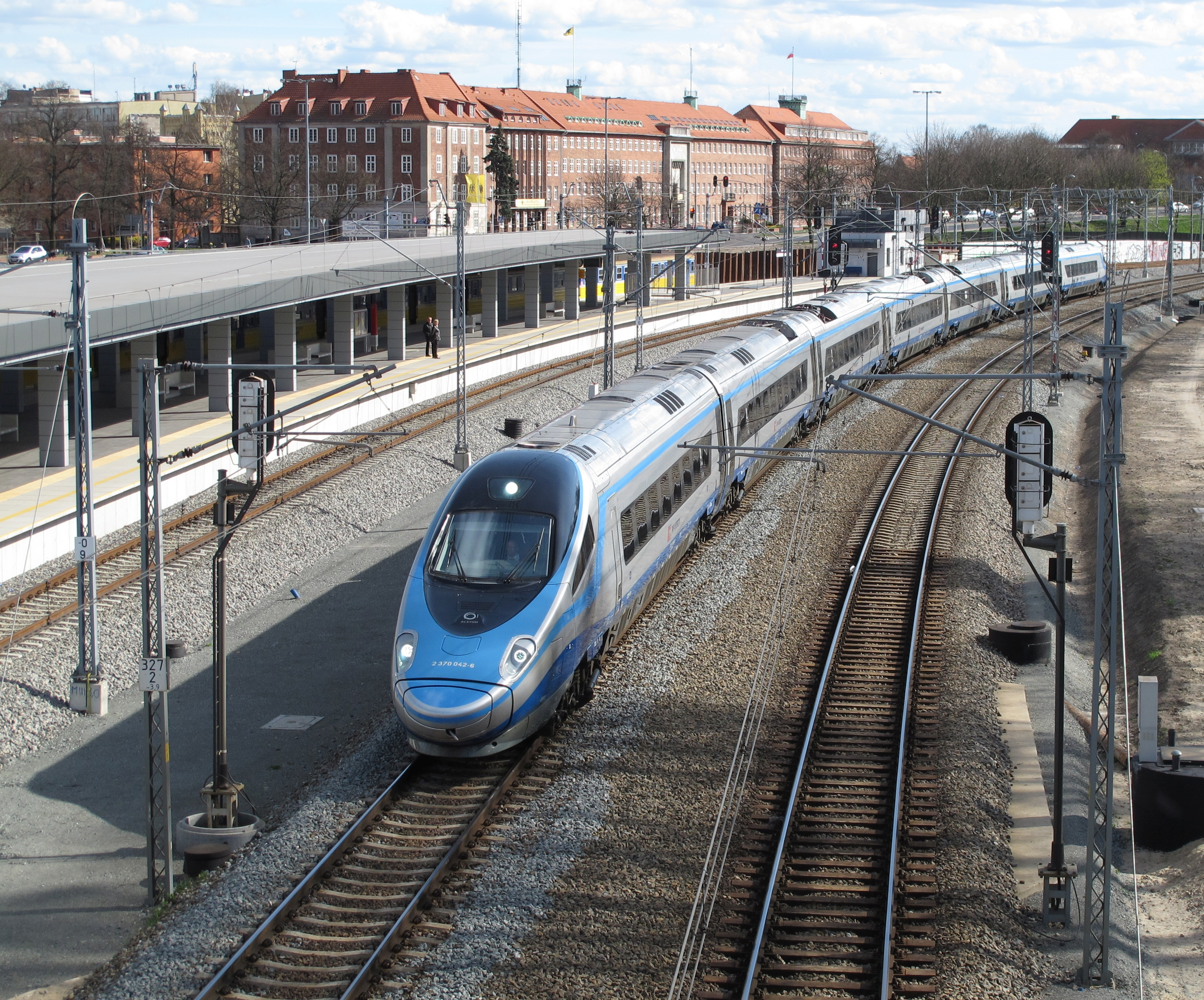
New Pendolino at Gdańsk Śródmieście.
