= Gdańsk Wrzeszcz–Gdańsk Osowa railway =

Railway line in Poland

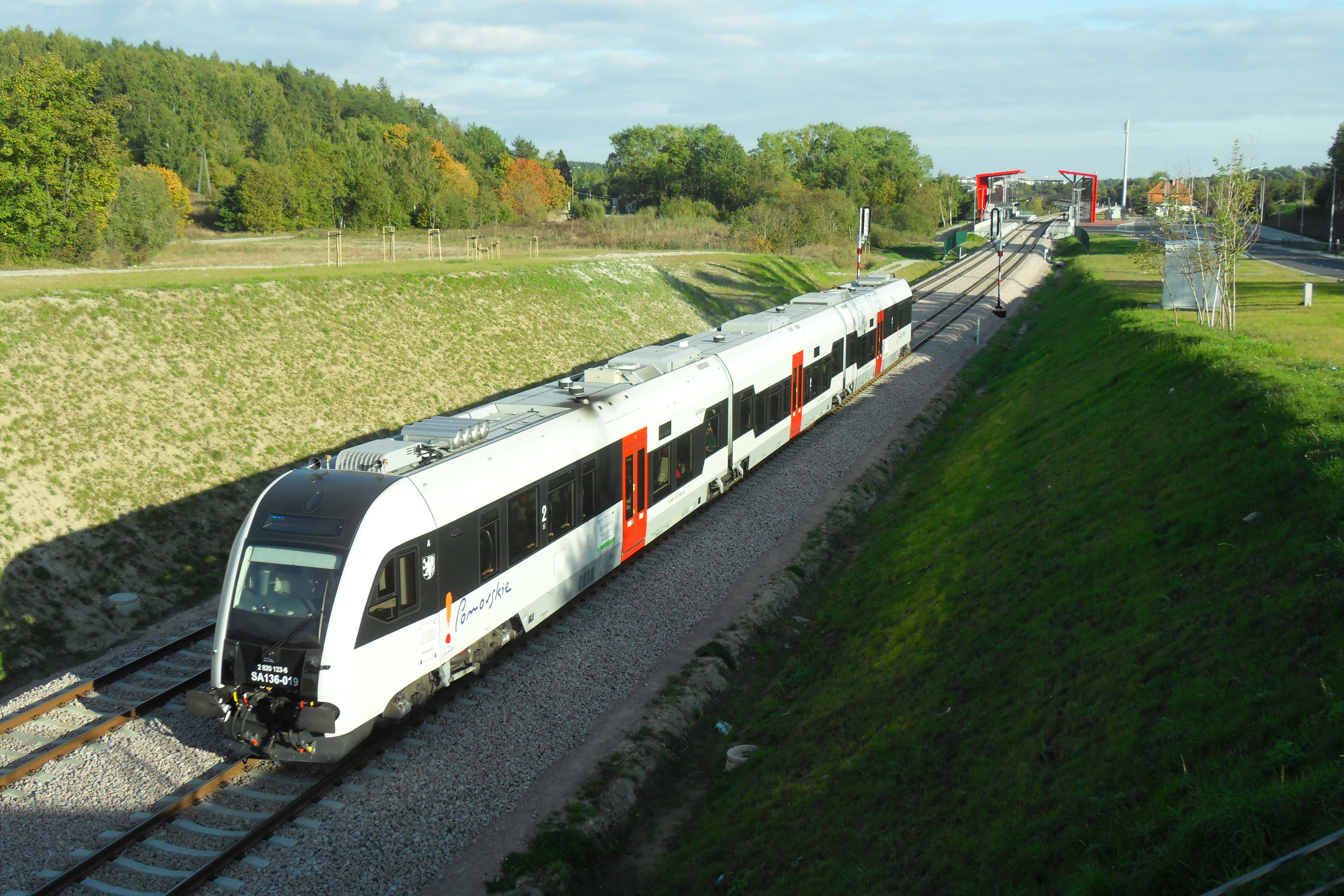
- SA136-019 leaving the Gdańsk Kiełpinek railway station

Overview
- Owner: PKP Polskie Linie Kolejowe (km -0.368 – 1.429); Pomeranian Metropolitan Railway (km 1.429 – 17.985), (km 17.985 – 18.050 and 18.182 – 18.247)
- Line number: 248
- Termini: Gdańsk Wrzeszcz; Gdańsk Osowa

History
- Opened: 2015

Technical
- Line length: 18.615 km (11.567 mi)
- Track gauge: 1,435 mm (4 ft 8 1/2 in)
- Operating speed: 120 km/h (75 mph)
Route map

Gdańsk Wrzeszcz–Gdańsk Osowa railway is a single- and double-track, mostly electrified railway line in Gdańsk, stretching 18.615 km. It is commonly referred to as the Pomeranian Metropolitan Railway.

The line was constructed between 2013 and 2015 by a consortium of companies, Budimex and Ferrovial Agroman, commissioned by the Pomeranian Metropolitan Railway company, which manages most of the line. Passenger train services began operating on 1 September 2015, and since December 2022, Polregio has been its operator.

In 2022, the construction of the new Gdańsk Firoga railway station was completed. Between 2021 and 2023, electrification work was carried out on the section managed by the Pomeranian Metropolitan Railway.

== History ==
=== Origins ===
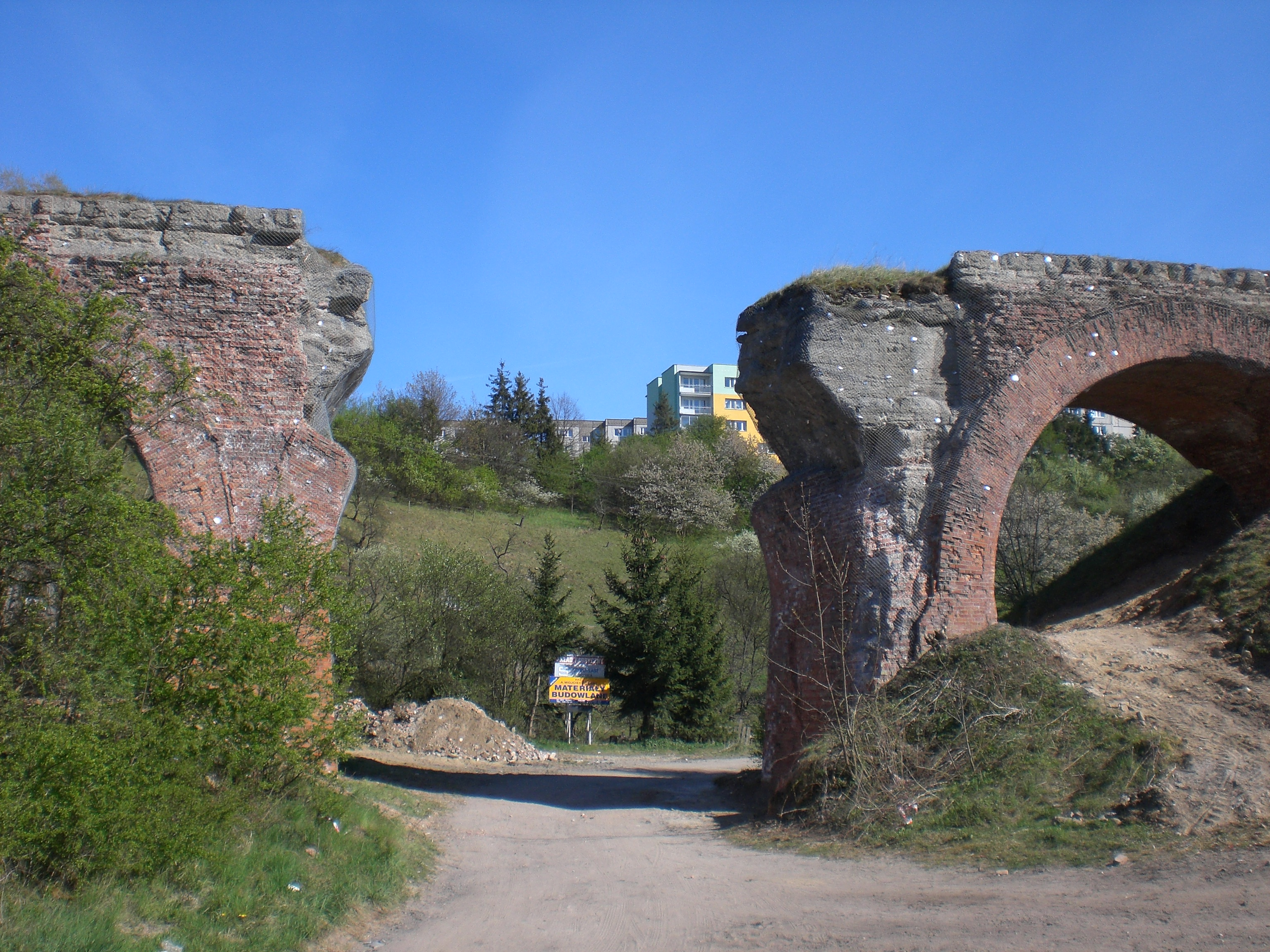
Remnants of the Gdańsk Wrzeszcz–Stara Piła railway in 2007

In 1930, Gdańsk's first airport was opened for regular passenger traffic, and in 1931, a railway stop named Danzig Flugplatz was established nearby (renamed Danzig Flughafen in 1936 and Gdańsk Lotnisko in 1945). The airport was closed in 1974, and the stop was renamed Gdańsk Zaspa. At the same time, Gdańsk Rębiechowo Airport was opened (since 2004, named after Lech Wałęsa). Initially, access to the new airport was provided by buses. However, as nearby Gdańsk residential districts expanded and air traffic increased, reaching the airport became increasingly difficult. Traffic congestion often occurred on Słowacki Street, the primary access road to the airport. Although the street was later expanded and modernized, this did not fully resolve the issue. Initially, a tram line was considered, but ultimately, the decision was made to rebuild the Gdańsk Wrzeszcz–Gdańsk Kokoszki railway. This was expected to not only improve airport access but also serve the newly built residential areas. Since Rębiechowo Airport also served Gdynia, a concept was developed to connect the airport to Gdynia via a section of Nowa Wieś Wielka–Gdynia Port railway.

The railway from Gdańsk Wrzeszcz to Gdańsk Kokoszki (which later formed the route of the Pomeranian Metropolitan Railway) was opened on 1 May 1914 as part of the Gdańsk Wrzeszcz–Stara Piła railway. This line was destroyed in March 1945 by German forces defending the Gdańsk area. The destruction of viaducts on the Gdańsk Wrzeszcz–Kiełpinek section (over Grunwaldzka Street, Wit Stwosz Street, Polanki Street, Słowacki Street, and Dolne Migowo Street) made reconstruction extremely costly. Additionally, its reconstruction was deemed unfeasible due to the line's primarily local character, as it only connected Gdańsk with Kartuzy. Despite the efforts of a social committee advocating for its reconstruction, the line was never rebuilt.

=== Preparation for reconstruction ===
In August 2005, the first study on the construction of a metropolitan railway in the Tricity was published as an alternative to road traffic. In May 2007, a preliminary feasibility study was completed. By July 2008, the project was included on the Key Projects List of the Operational Programme Infrastructure and Environment. In December 2009, a full feasibility study was finalized. According to the original plans, the metropolitan railway was intended to connect Gdańsk and Gdynia with Gdańsk Rębiechowo Airport, as well as Gdynia with the planned Gdynia-Kosakowo Airport. The line was expected to be electrified during its construction and ready for operation in time for the UEFA Euro 2012.

On 31 May 2010, the Pomeranian Voivodeship Assembly established the company Pomeranian Metropolitan Railway, tasked with constructing the railway line.

=== Construction ===
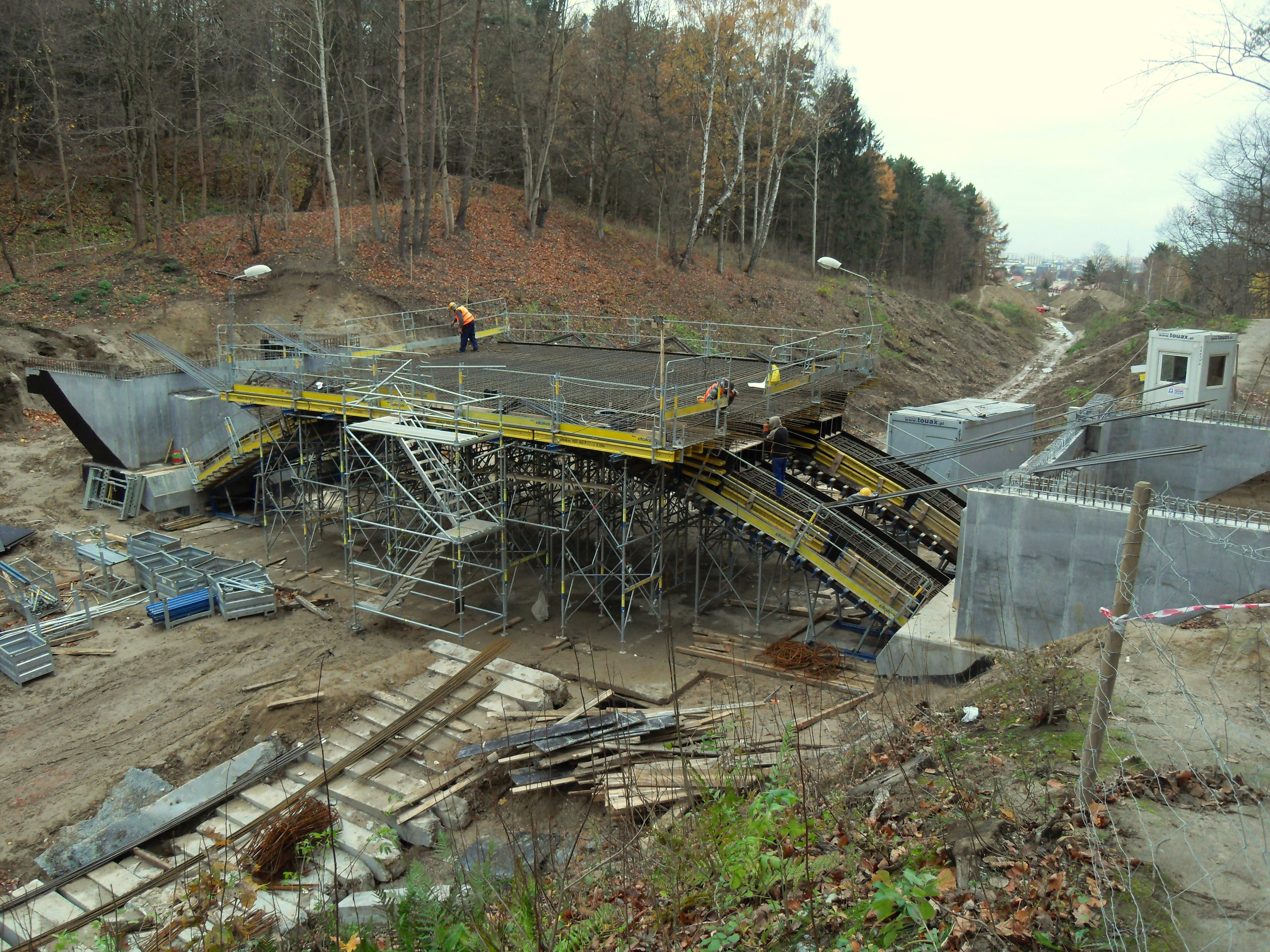
Construction of a viaduct in place of the demolished Weiser Bridge (as of November 2013)

On 7 May 2013, the Pomeranian Metropolitan Railway company signed an agreement with the consortium of Budimex and Ferrovial Agroman for the design and construction of the line. The agreement covered:

- A double-track Gdańsk Wrzeszcz–Gdańsk Osowa railway
- A single-track connecting Gdańsk Rębiechowo–Gdańsk Osowa R1 railway
- 8 railway stations
- A technical station near the Gdańsk Rębiechowo railway station
- A local traffic control center at the Gdańsk Matarnia railway station
- Railway and road viaducts, overpasses, pedestrian footbridges, culverts, and animal crossings
- European Rail Traffic Management System

On 31 January 2014, PKP Polskie Linie Kolejowe signed an agreement with Torpol for the modernization of Gdańsk Wrzeszcz railway station, making it possible to connect Gdańsk Wrzeszcz–Gdańsk Osowa railway to the station. On 27 May 2014, PKP Polskie Linie Kolejowe signed an agreement with the consortium of companies, headed by Rubau Polska, for the revitalization and reconstruction of a section of Nowa Wieś Wielka–Gdynia Port railway necessary for connecting to Gdańsk Wrzeszcz–Gdańsk Osowa railway.

In March 2015, the first train, a SM48 diesel locomotive pushing five ballast cars, entered Gdańsk Wrzeszcz–Gdańsk Osowa railway. The tamping machine followed behind. In March, the construction of all six GSM-R masts was completed, forming part of the ERTMS system for automating train movement supervision. In April, the installation of ERTMS balises began on the line.

=== Tests ===
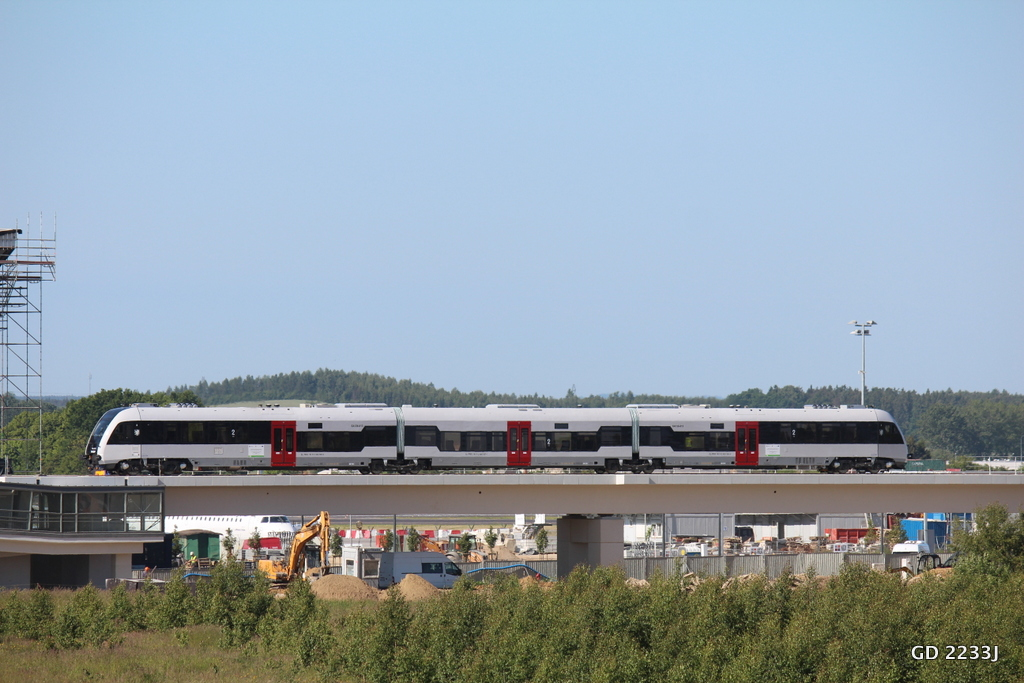
Three-carriage SA136 during testing

In April 2015, the first tests of the line were conducted by a Traxx F140 DE locomotive owned by Lotos Kolej. During the tests, various factors were checked, including the radio signal coverage of the entire line at a maximum speed of 120 km/h. In May, rescue drills took place at the Gdańsk Matarnia railway station.

On 12 June, a ceremonial presentation of one of the vehicles purchased for its operation – SA136-013 – took place on the line. In June, the line continued to be tested, this time with trains purchased for its service. In July, the line was tested by the SM42 locomotive and SA103 diesel railcar belonging to Polregio. Between the tests of the SM42 locomotive and the SA103 diesel railcar, a Speno rail grinder worked to prepare the tracks on the Pomeranian Metropolitan Railway. At the beginning of August, the SA136 vehicles were again used for line testing, this time operated by Tricity Szybka Kolej Miejska drivers.

=== Operation ===
On 1 September 2015, the line was opened for use.

At the end of December 2015, between the WK2 viaduct (above Gdańsk Główny–Stargard railway) and the WK3 viaduct (above Grunwaldzka Avenue), there was a land slide on the embankment, which required the temporary closure of the southern track in this area. On 18 March 2016, train traffic was restored on both tracks in this section. The repair was carried out by Budimex under the warranty.

On the night of 14–15 July 2016, a heavy rainstorm hit Gdańsk, resulting in the collapse of the protective top layer of the railway embankments, affecting 21% of the total surface of the slopes and embankments on the Pomeranian Metropolitan Railway. This led to a complete suspension of train traffic and the introduction of bus replacement services. In addition to surface runoff from the embankment's protective layer, cables were exposed, manhole covers were undermined, drainage trays were torn off, drainage ditches were clogged, and ballast was contaminated. A total of 688 defects were recorded, 56 of which required repair before train traffic could be resumed. On 19 July, train traffic was restored on the Gdańsk Osowa–Gdańsk Port Lotniczy section. On 12 August, actual repair work began, and on 31 August, line tests were conducted before its reopening on 4 September (between Brętowo and Strzyża, single-track operations were in place). On 1 November, double-track operation was restored along the entire line.

At the end of July 2017, two small localized landslides occurred on the embankments, leading to temporary speed restrictions of 40 km/h.

=== Electrification ===
During its construction, Gdańsk Wrzeszcz–Gdańsk Osowa railway was partially prepared for future electrification: a project for the electrification of the entire line was developed, and special spaces were designated on viaducts for the installation of traction poles. In February 2017, a tender was announced for a feasibility study on the electrification of Gdańsk Wrzeszcz–Gdańsk Osowa and Gdańsk Rębiechowo–Gdańsk Osowa R1 railways. In March 2018, a decision was made to allocate 85% of the project's funding from European Union funds, amounting to 61 million PLN, while the total estimated cost of the investment was 73 million PLN (by the second half of 2020, the estimated cost was 89 million PLN).

In September 2018, Pomeranian Metropolitan Railway (the administrator of Gdańsk Wrzeszcz–Gdańsk Osowa railway) announced a tender for the electrification project of Gdańsk Wrzeszcz–Gdańsk Osowa and Gdańsk Rębiechowo–Gdańsk Osowa R1 railways, along with the construction of an additional railway station, Gdańsk Firoga. Among the four submitted bids, the lowest was from the Communication Design Office in Poznań (2.56 million PLN), and it was the only one below the allocated budget of 2.76 million PLN. As a result, a contract was signed on 11 January 2019 for the preparation of project documentation.

In 2021, offers were opened for the implementation of the electrification project for Gdańsk Wrzeszcz–Gdańsk Osowa and Gdańsk Rębiechowo–Gdańsk Osowa R1 railways, along with the construction of the railway station in Firoga. Among the 11 submitted bids, the lowest came from Poznań-based Torpol (48.8 million PLN), which was 19 million PLN below the preliminary budget of 67.8 million PLN.

A contract with the contractor was signed on 30 April 2021. Work began on 15 June between the Gdańsk Brętowo and Jasień railway stations. On the night of 8–9 November 2022, the first electric train, an EN57ALd electric multiple unit, ran on the Pomeranian Metropolitan Railway between Gdańsk Wrzeszcz and Gdańsk Kiełpinek. The electrification of the Pomeranian Metropolitan Railway lasted until June 2023, and on the night of 9–10 June 2023, the final test run took place between Gdańsk Wrzeszcz and Gdańsk Port Lotniczy. On 12 June, the first scheduled electric train entered service on the line.

Alongside the electrification of Gdańsk Wrzeszcz–Gdańsk Osowa railway, PKP Polskie Linie Kolejowe had announced plans to electrify Nowa Wieś Wielka–Gdynia Port railway (which connects with Gdańsk Wrzeszcz–Gdańsk Osowa railway in Rębiechowo). However, this did not happen, making it impossible to use electric trainsets for connections to Kościerzyna and Kartuzy.

== Technical parameters ==
The line is electrified and equipped with ETCS level 2. The smallest curve on the line has a radius of 360 m and is located on the viaduct at the exit from the Gdańsk Wrzeszcz railway station.

=== List of maximum speeds (km/h) ===
Speed			Kilometage		Speed		
track 1			from	to	track 2		
wagon trains	railbuses and electric multiple units	freight trains	from	to	wagon trains	railbuses and electric multiple units	freight trains
80		60	-0.368	-0.266			
80		60	-0.266	1.103	80		60
80		70	1.103	1.429	80		60
80		70	1.429	2.710	80		70
120		80	2.710	2.713	80		70
120		80	2.713	2.869	120		70
120		80	2.869	13.119	120		80
100		80	13.119	13.127	120		80
100		80	13.127	14.242	100		80
90		80	14.242	14.248	100		80
90		80	14.248	14.494	90		80
90		80	14.494	14.499	120		80
120		80	14.499	17.985	120		80
120		80	17.985	18.050	120		80
120		80	18.050	18.247			

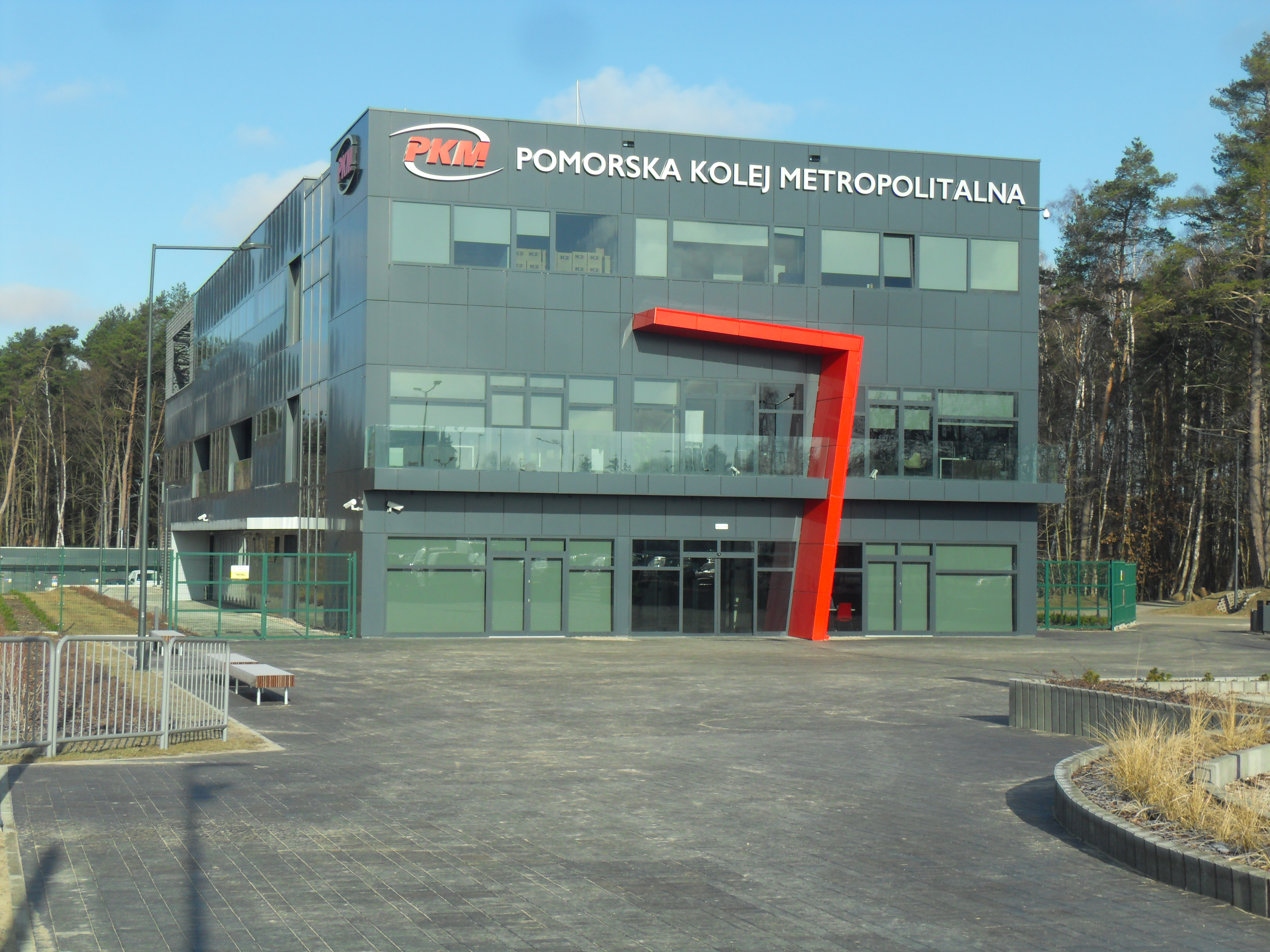
Local Control Centre at the Gdańsk Matarnia railway station

== Operational points ==
Name of the railway station	Photo	Number of platform edges	Infrastructure	Source
Gdańsk Wrzeszcz		7	Railway station, underground passage, siding tracks	
Gdańsk Strzyża		2		
Gdańsk Niedźwiednik		2		
Gdańsk Brętowo		2	Integrated tram stop	
Gdańsk Jasień		2		
Gdańsk Kiełpinek		2	Overhead passage	
Gdańsk Matarnia		2		
Gdańsk Firoga		2		
Gdańsk Port Lotniczy		2		
Gdańsk Rębiechowo		2	Overhead passage, siding tracks	
Gdańsk Osowa		3	Railway station	

== Engineering structures ==
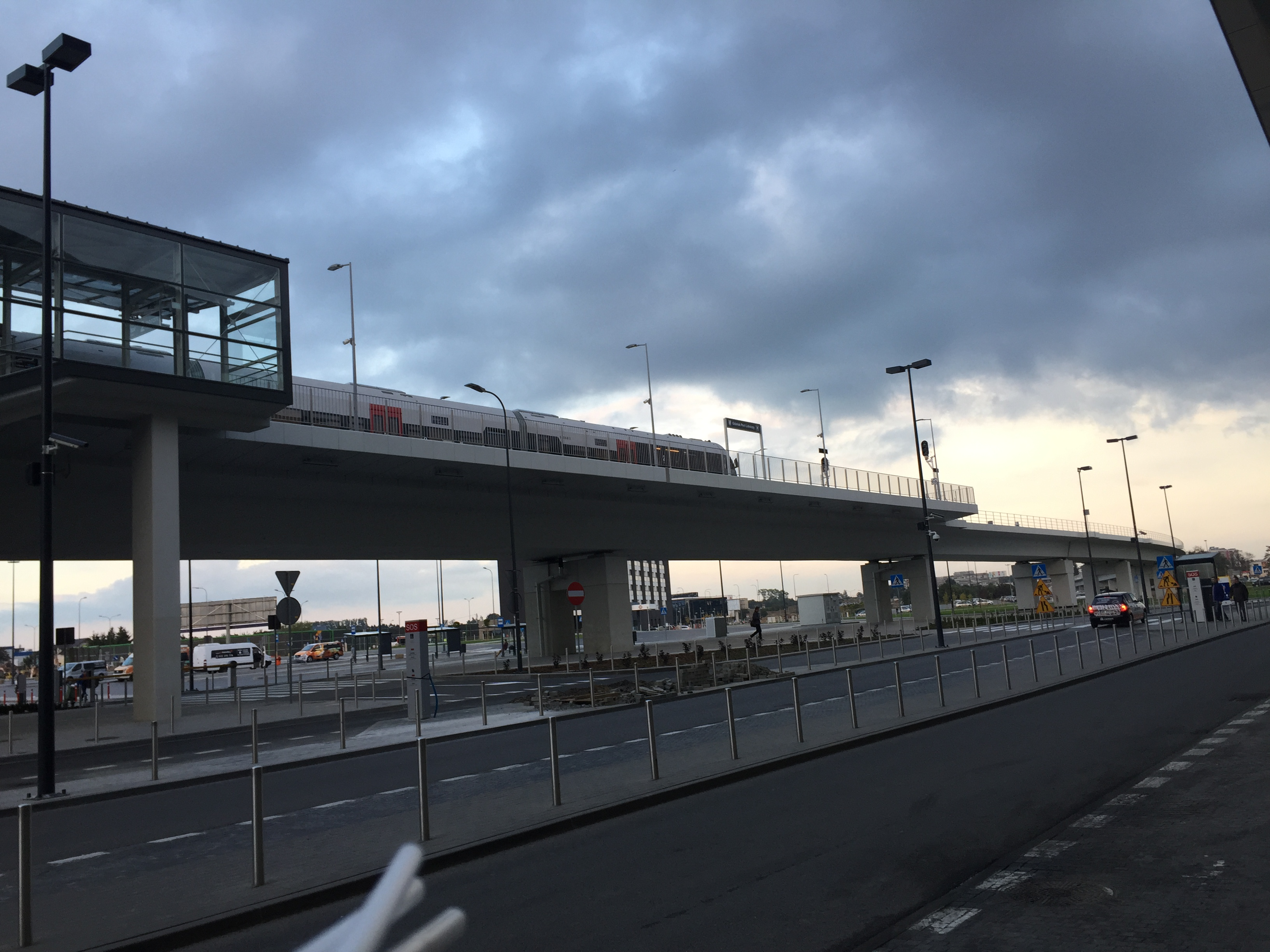
Viaduct at Gdańsk Lech Wałęsa Airport

There are 41 engineering structures on Gdańsk Wrzeszcz–Gdańsk Osowa railway and connecting Gdańsk Rębiechowo–Gdańsk Osowa R1 railway, including 17 railway viaducts, 5 road viaducts, 4 pedestrian footbridges, and 15 culverts and under-track passages. The largest engineering structure is the 940-meter-long viaduct near Gdańsk Lech Wałęsa Airport. All the engineering structures are reinforced concrete constructions, except for viaduct WK2 over Gdańsk Główny–Stargard railway near Gdańsk Zaspa railway station, which has a steel structure.

== Train operations ==
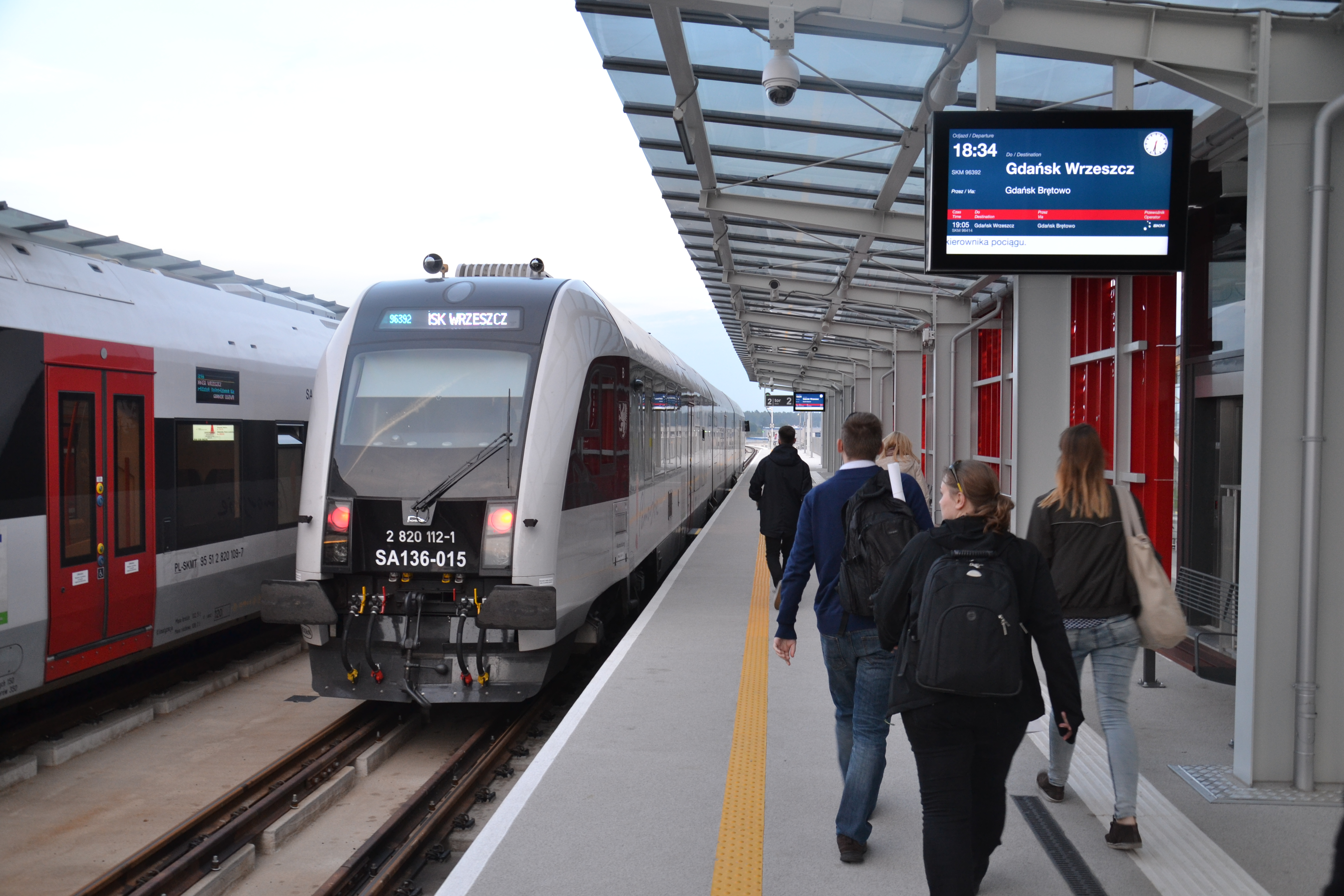
Train to Wrzeszcz at the Gdańsk Port Lotniczy railway station

On 14 April 2015, the Pomeranian Voivodeship Board decided to announce an open tender for train services on Gdańsk Wrzeszcz–Gdańsk Osowa railway. The service was to be part of a joint task with the Wejherowo–Gdynia Główna–Gdańsk Główny–Tczew connection, which had previously been operated by PKP Szybka Kolej Miejska in Tricity. The only bid in this tender was submitted by this company, and on 11 June, the bid was approved by the voivodeship board.

On 2 September 2014, the Pomeranian Voivodeship signed a contract with Pesa for the delivery of 3 two-car diesel multiple units 218Mc and seven three-car units 219M dedicated to servicing the Pomeranian Metropolitan Railway. In addition to these 10 vehicles, Pomeranian Metropolitan Railway is also served by 3 other previously purchased rail vehicles (two SA137 and one SA138).

The line was created to provide convenient access to the airport and improve connectivity between the Kartuzy and Kościerzyna counties and the Tricity area. Within two months after the launch, around 100,000 passengers used the line monthly (compared to over 3 million on the Szybka Kolej Miejska lines).

On 1 September 2015, trains began running on the Gdańsk Główny–Gdańsk Port Lotniczy–Gdynia Główna route (and shortened versions). On 1 October, service expanded to Gdańsk Główny–Gdańsk Port Lotniczy–Kartuzy.

On 11 December 2016, an expedited connection was launched between Gdynia Główna–Gdańsk Wrzeszcz–Gdańsk Port Lotniczy–Kościerzyna, with stops only at Gdańsk Strzyża, Gdańsk Jasień, Gdańsk Kiełpinek, and Gdańsk Port Lotniczy.

On 9 December 2018, Polregio took over part of the services on Gdańsk Wrzeszcz–Gdańsk Osowa railway.

On 14 November 2022, the Pomeranian Voivodeship Board approved the results of the tender for passenger services on Pomeranian Metropolitan Railway lines, entrusting the operation of connections between Gdańsk, Gdynia, Kościerzyna, and Kartuzy to Polregio for the period from 11 December 2022 to 12 December 2026.

On 15 May 2023, the Pomeranian Voivodeship signed a contract with Newag for the delivery of 4 hybrid (electric-diesel) multiple units Impuls, intended for service on Gdańsk Wrzeszcz–Gdańsk Osowa railway. The first of these trains began service on this line in June 2024.
