= Gdańsk Brętowo railway station =

Railway station in Gdańsk, Poland

Coordinates: 54.3661°N 18.5756°E

Gdańsk Brętowo
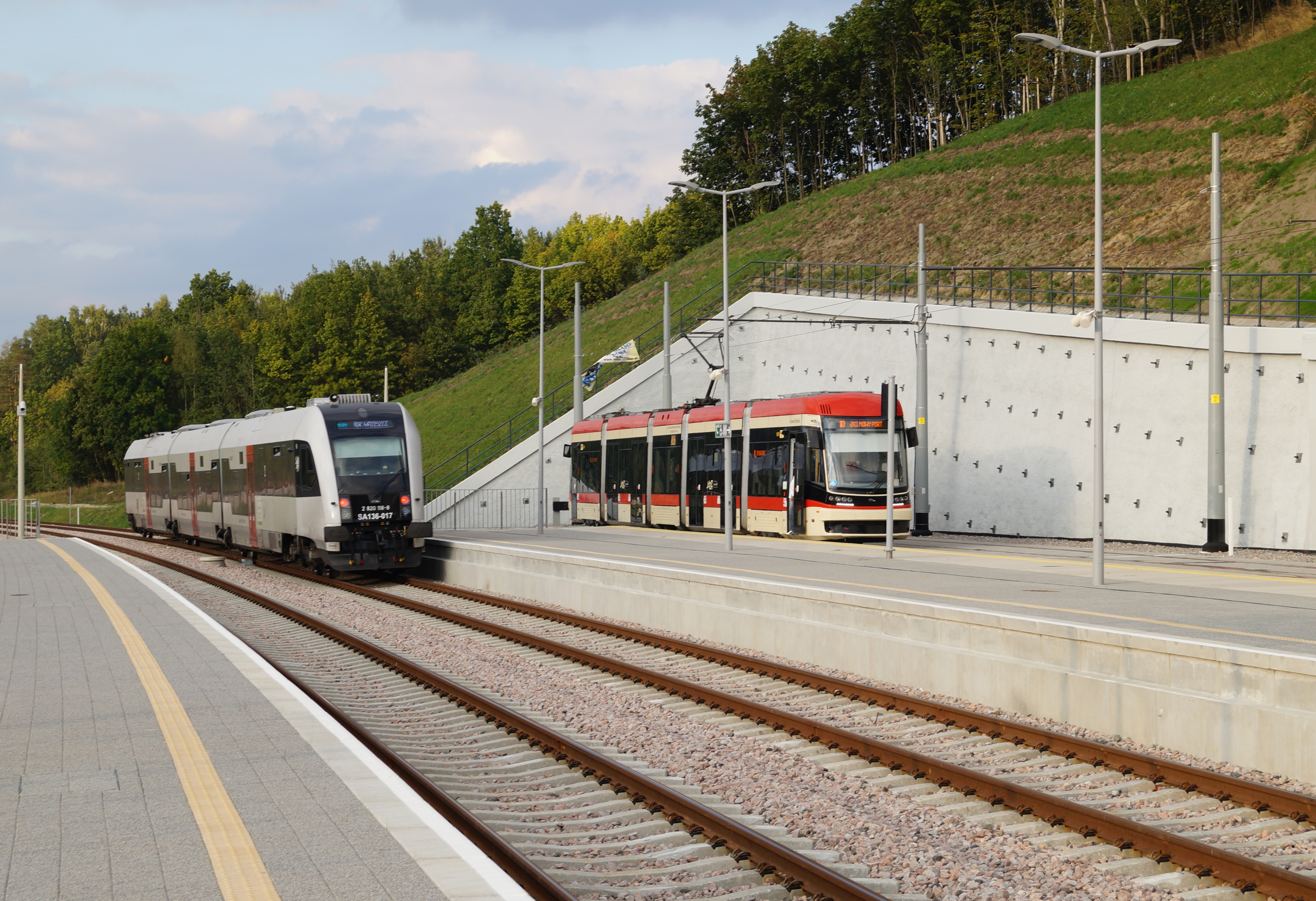
- Gdańsk Brętowo railway station

General information
- Location: Gdańsk, Pomeranian Voivodeship; Poland
- System: Railway Station
- Operator: SKM Tricity
- Line: 248: Gdańsk Wrzeszcz–Gdańsk Osowa railway
- Platforms: 2
- Tracks: 2

History
- Opened: 1 May 1914; 112 years ago
- Closed: 1945
- Rebuilt: 1 September 2015; 10 years ago
- Former names: Danzig Brentau (until 1945)
Location
- Location within Poland

Gdańsk Brętowo railway station is a railway station serving the city of Gdańsk, in the Pomeranian Voivodeship, Poland. The station opened on 1 May 1914 on the Gdańsk Wrzeszcz–Stara Piła railway. The station closed following destruction of the line during World War II. The station re-opened on 1 September 2015 and is located on the Gdańsk Wrzeszcz–Gdańsk Osowa railway. The train services are operated by SKM Tricity as part of the Pomorska Kolej Metropolitalna (PKM).

== Train services ==
The station is served by the following services:

- Pomorska Kolej Metropolitalna services (R) Gdynia Główna — Gdańsk Osowa — Gdańsk Port Lotniczy (Airport) — Gdańsk Wrzeszcz
- Pomorska Kolej Metropolitalna services (R) Kartuzy — Gdańsk Port Lotniczy (Airport) — Gdańsk Główny

Preceding station	Polregio	Following station
Gdańsk Jasień towards Gdynia Główna	PR (Via Gdańsk Port Lotniczy (Airport))	Gdańsk Niedźwiednik towards Gdańsk Wrzeszcz
Gdańsk Niedźwiednik towards Gdańsk Główny	PR (Via Gdańsk Port Lotniczy (Airport))	Gdańsk Jasień towards Kartuzy

== Public transport ==
Tram line 10 from the city centre stop on a platform adjacent to the new railway platforms. Bus services stop on the road below the station, these are: 10, 116, 131, 184, 210, 227, 283, N6.
