= Gdańsk Niedźwiednik railway station =

Railway station in Gdańsk, Poland

Coordinates: 54.3772°N 18.5718°E

Gdańsk Niedźwiednik
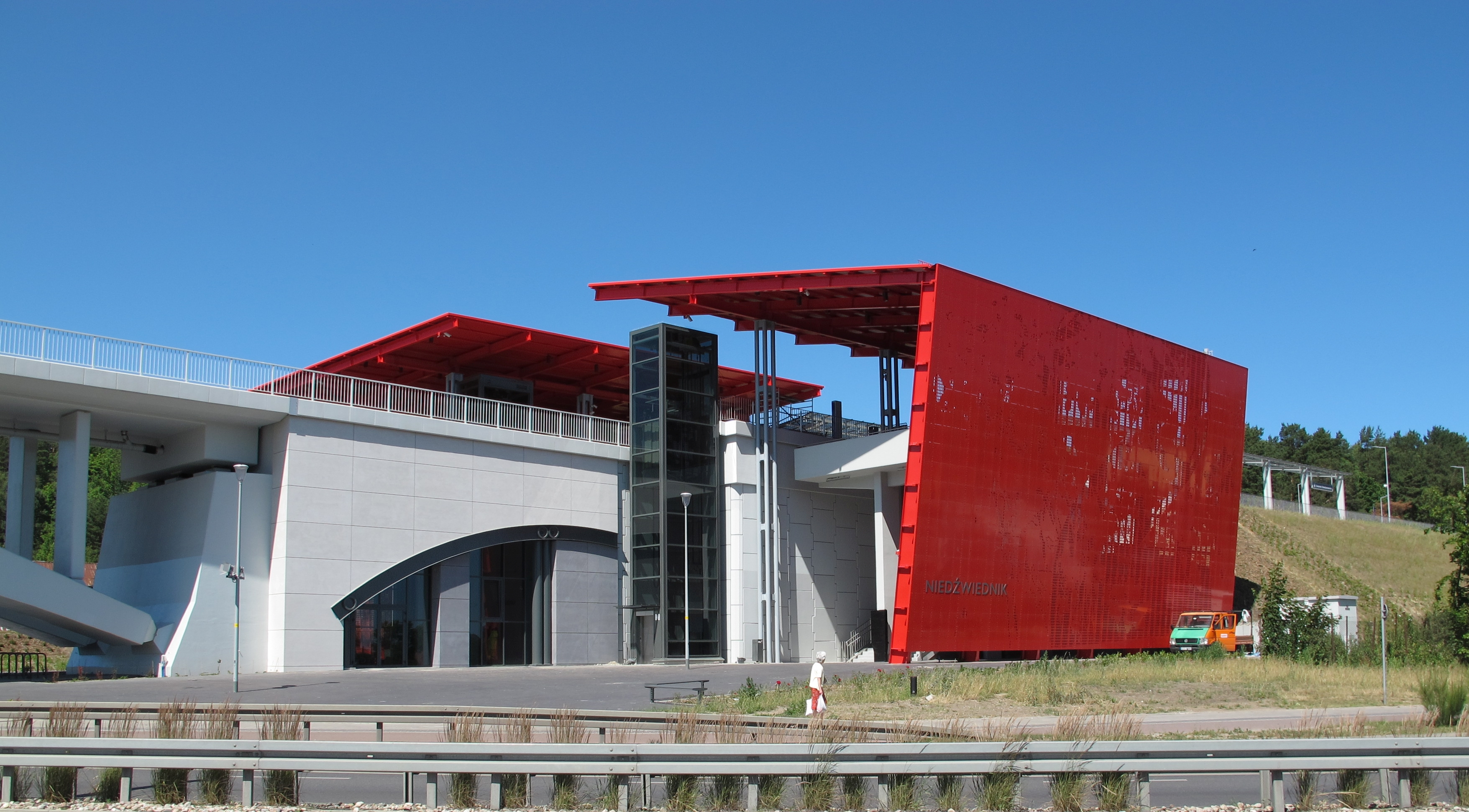
- Gdańsk Niedźwiednik railway station

General information
- Location: Gdańsk, Pomeranian Voivodeship; Poland
- System: Railway Station
- Operator: Polregio
- Line: 248: Gdańsk Wrzeszcz–Gdańsk Osowa railway
- Platforms: 2
- Tracks: 2

History
- Opened: 1 September 2015; 10 years ago
Location
- Location within Poland

Gdańsk Niedźwiednik railway station is a railway station serving the city of Gdańsk, in the Pomeranian Voivodeship, Poland. The station opened on 1 September 2015 and is located on the Gdańsk Wrzeszcz–Gdańsk Osowa railway. The train services are operated by Polregio as part of the Pomorska Kolej Metropolitalna (PKM).

== Train services ==
The station is served by the following services:

- Pomorska Kolej Metropolitalna services (R) Gdynia Główna — Gdańsk Osowa — Gdańsk Port Lotniczy (Airport) — Gdańsk Wrzeszcz
- Pomorska Kolej Metropolitalna services (R) Kartuzy — Gdańsk Port Lotniczy (Airport) — Gdańsk Główny

Preceding station	Polregio	Following station
Gdańsk Brętowo towards Gdynia Główna	PR (Via Gdańsk Port Lotniczy (Airport))	Gdańsk Strzyża towards Gdańsk Wrzeszcz
Gdańsk Strzyża towards Gdańsk Główny	PR (Via Gdańsk Port Lotniczy (Airport))	Gdańsk Brętowo towards Kartuzy

== Public transport ==
Bus stop Niedźwiednik PKM (N/Ż) is located close to the station. The following services call here:

110, 116, 126, 157, 136, 227, N3
