= Gdynia Wielki Kack railway station =

Railway station in Gdynia, Poland

Gdynia Wielki Kack
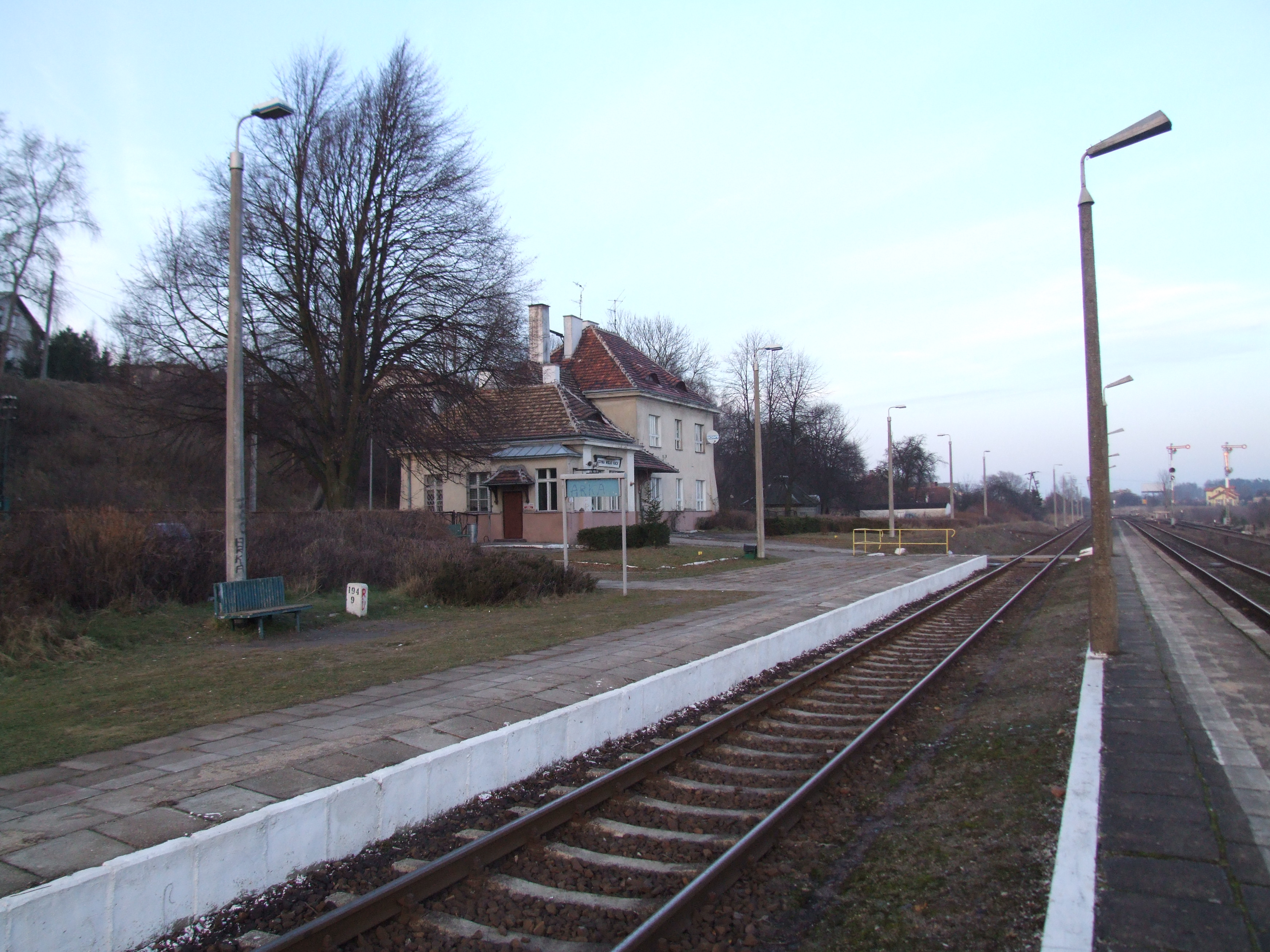
- Gdynia Wielki Kack railway station in 2005

General information
- Location: Gdynia, Pomeranian Voivodeship; Poland
- System: Railway Station
- Operator: SKM Tricity
- Line: 201: Nowa Wieś Wielka–Gdynia Port railway

History
- Opened: 20 November 1921; 104 years ago
- Rebuilt: 2015
Location
- Location within Poland

Gdynia Wielki Kack railway station is a railway station serving the city of Gdynia, in the Pomeranian Voivodeship, Poland. The station opened in 1921 and is located on the Nowa Wieś Wielka–Gdynia Port railway. The train services are operated by SKM Tricity.

== Modernisation ==
The station was modernised in 2015 as part of the works for the Pomorska Kolej Metropolitalna.

== Train services ==
The station is served by the following service(s):

- Pomorska Kolej Metropolitalna services (R) Gdansk - Gdansk Airport - Gdansk Osowa - Gdynia
- Regional services (R) Koscierzyna - Zukowo - Gdansk Osowa - Gdynia

| Preceding station | SKM Tricity | Following station |
|---|---|---|
| Gdańsk Osowa towards Gdańsk Wrzeszcz or Kościerzyna | SKM Tricity | Gdynia Główna Terminus |
