= Gdańsk Jasień railway station =

Railway station in Gdańsk, Poland

Coordinates: 54.3536°N 18.5500°E

Gdańsk Jasień
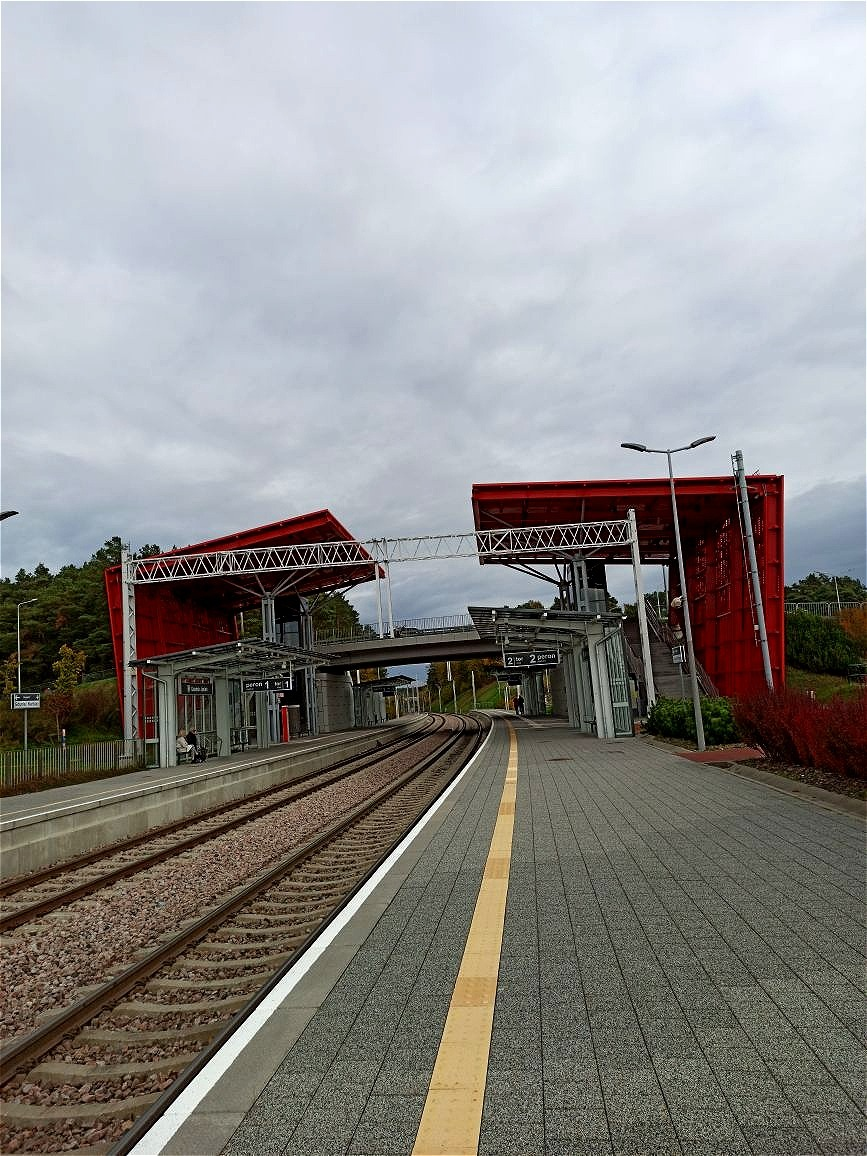
- Gdańsk Jasień railway station

General information
- Location: Gdańsk, Pomeranian Voivodeship; Poland
- System: Railway station
- Operator: SKM Tricity
- Line: 248: Gdańsk Wrzeszcz–Gdańsk Osowa railway
- Platforms: 2
- Tracks: 2

History
- Opened: 1 September 2015; 10 years ago
Location
- Location within Poland

Gdańsk Jasień railway station is a railway station serving the city of Gdańsk, in the Pomeranian Voivodeship, Poland. The station opened on 1 September 2015 and is located on the Gdańsk Wrzeszcz–Gdańsk Osowa railway. The train services are operated by SKM Tricity as part of the Pomorska Kolej Metropolitalna (PKM).

== Train services ==
The station is served by the following services:

- Pomorska Kolej Metropolitalna services (R) Gdynia Główna — Gdańsk Osowa — Gdańsk Port Lotniczy (Airport) — Gdańsk Wrzeszcz
- Pomorska Kolej Metropolitalna services (R) Kartuzy — Gdańsk Port Lotniczy (Airport) — Gdańsk Główny
- Pomorska Kolej Metropolitalna services (R) Kościerzyna — Gdańsk Port Lotniczy (Airport) — Gdańsk Wrzeszcz — Gdynia Główna

Preceding station	Polregio	Following station
Gdańsk Kiełpinek towards Gdynia Główna	PR (Via Gdańsk Port Lotniczy (Airport))	Gdańsk Brętowo towards Gdańsk Wrzeszcz
Gdańsk Brętowo towards Gdańsk Główny	PR (Via Gdańsk Port Lotniczy (Airport))	Gdańsk Kiełpinek towards Kartuzy
Gdańsk Kiełpinek towards Kościerzyna	PR (Via Gdańsk Port Lotniczy (Airport) and Gdańsk Wrzeszcz)	Gdańsk Strzyża towards Gdynia Główna

== Public transport ==
Bus services call at Jasień PKM. The following services call here:

127, 130, 155, 268
