= Gdańsk Rębiechowo railway station =

Railway station in Gdańsk, Poland

Coordinates: 54.3883°N 18.4436°E

Gdańsk Rębiechowo
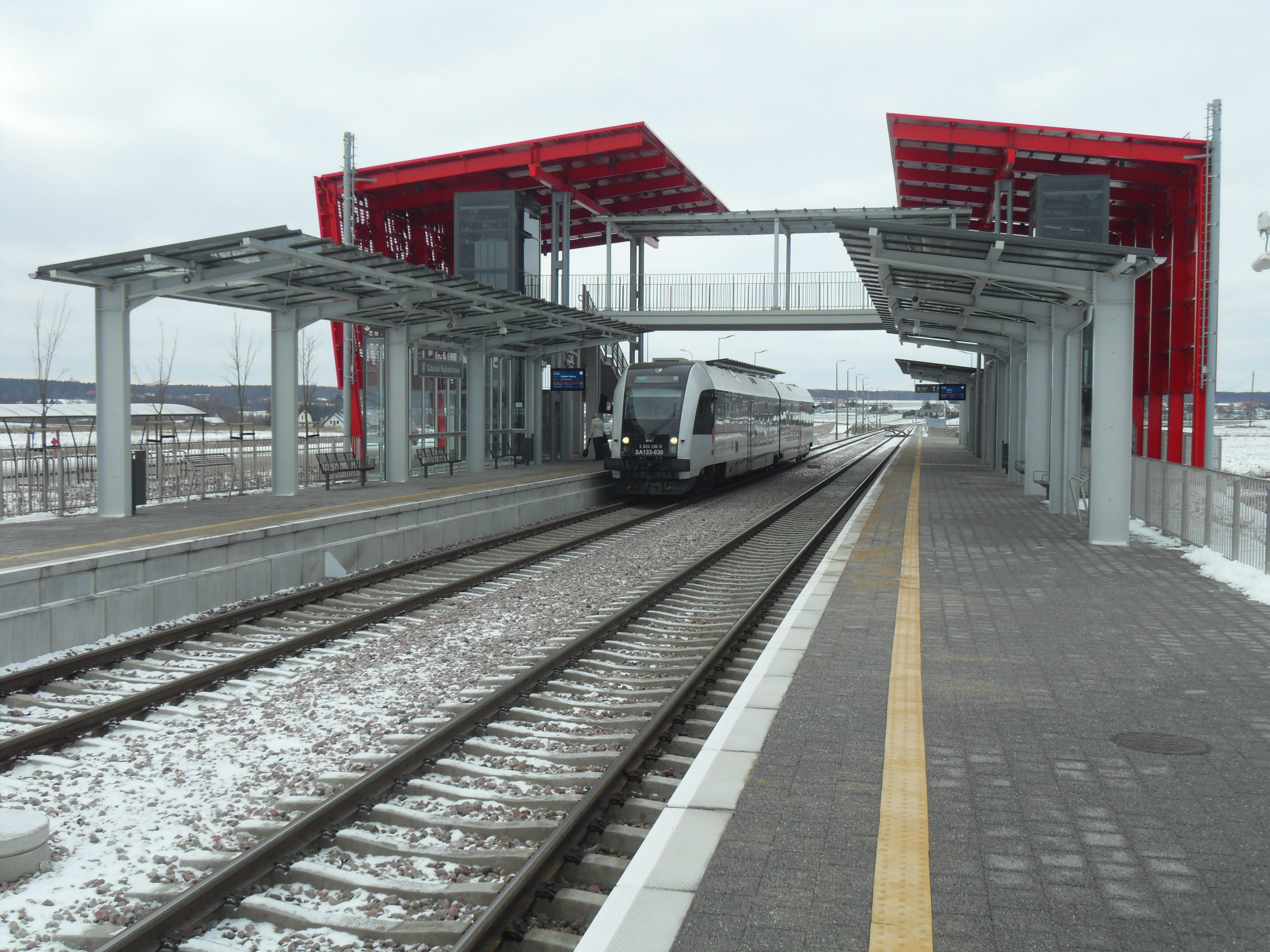
- Gdańsk Rębiechowo railway station

General information
- Location: Gdańsk, Pomeranian Voivodeship; Poland
- System: Railway Station
- Operator: SKM Tricity
- Lines: 248: Gdańsk Wrzeszcz–Gdańsk Osowa railway 253: Gdańsk Rębiechowo–Rębiechowo railway
- Platforms: 2
- Tracks: 2

History
- Opened: 1 September 2015; 10 years ago
Location
- Location within Poland

Gdańsk Rębiechowo railway station is a railway station in the city of Gdańsk, in the Pomeranian Voivodeship, Poland. The station opened on 1 September 2015 and is located on the Gdańsk Wrzeszcz–Gdańsk Osowa railway and Gdańsk Rębiechowo–Rębiechowo railway. The train services are operated by SKM Tricity as part of the Pomorska Kolej Metropolitalna (PKM).

== Train services ==
The station is served by the following services:

- Pomorska Kolej Metropolitalna services (R) Gdynia Główna — Gdańsk Osowa — Gdańsk Port Lotniczy (Airport) — Gdańsk Wrzeszcz
- Pomorska Kolej Metropolitalna services (R) Kartuzy — Gdańsk Port Lotniczy (Airport) — Gdańsk Główny

Preceding station	Polregio	Following station
Gdańsk Osowa towards Gdynia Główna	PR (Via Gdańsk Port Lotniczy (Airport))	Gdańsk Port Lotniczy (Airport) towards Gdańsk Wrzeszcz
Gdańsk Port Lotniczy (Airport) towards Gdańsk Główny	PR (Via Gdańsk Port Lotniczy (Airport))	Rębiechowo towards Kartuzy
