= Gdańsk Strzyża railway station =

Railway station in Gdańsk, Poland

Gdańsk Strzyża
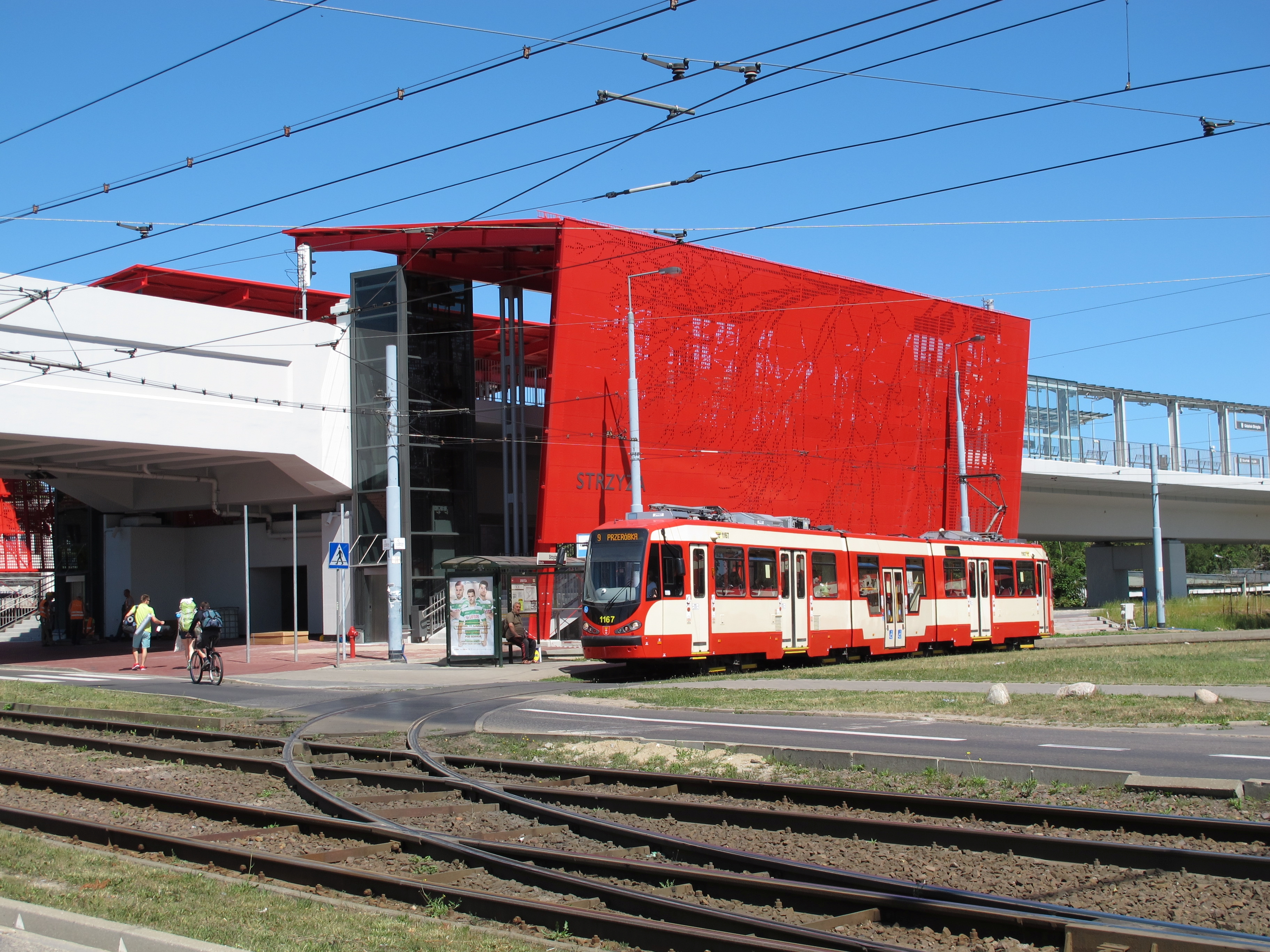
- Gdańsk Strzyża railway station

General information
- Location: Gdańsk, Pomeranian Voivodeship; Poland
- System: Railway Station
- Operator: SKM Tricity
- Line: 248: Gdańsk Wrzeszcz–Gdańsk Osowa railway
- Platforms: 2
- Tracks: 2

History
- Opened: 1 September 2015; 11 years ago
Location
- Location within Poland

Gdańsk Strzyża railway station is a railway station serving the city of Gdańsk, in the Pomeranian Voivodeship, Poland. The station opened on 1 September 2015 and is located on the Gdańsk Wrzeszcz–Gdańsk Osowa railway. The station is located in the Strzyża district of the city. The train services are operated by SKM Tricity as part of the Pomorska Kolej Metropolitalna (PKM).

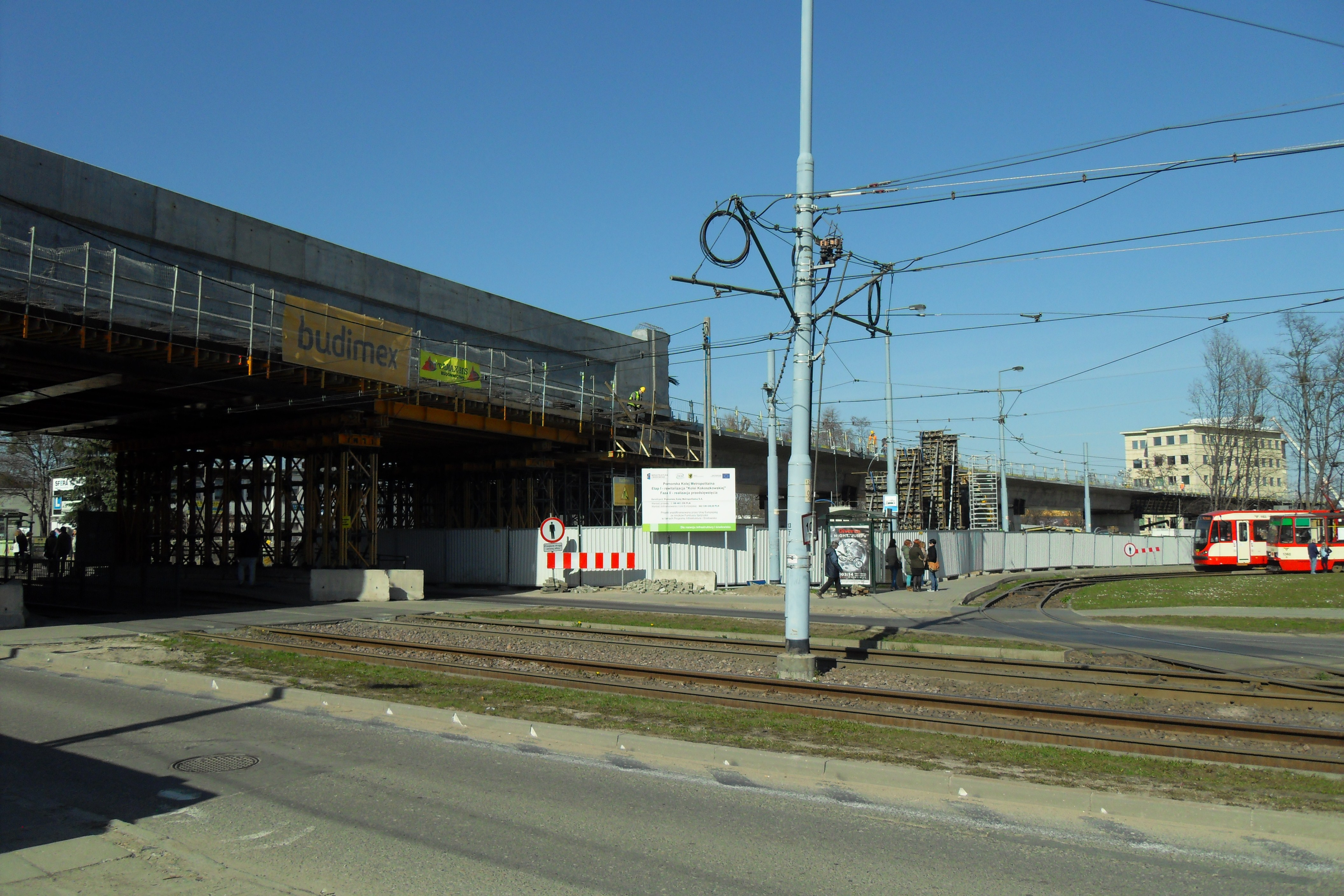
Construction work to build the line in 2014

== History ==
The Gdańsk Wrzeszcz–Stara Piła railway passed the site where the station is located today. A viaduct over the road existed then too, but was blown up by the Germans on 26 March 1945, to slow down the movement of the Soviets. The remnants of the viaduct, either side of the road, stayed in a derelict state for years. These were demolished in 2013 to make way for the building work on for the new PKM.

== Train services ==
The station is served by the following services:

- Pomorska Kolej Metropolitalna services (R) Gdynia Główna — Gdańsk Osowa — Gdańsk Port Lotniczy (Airport) — Gdańsk Wrzeszcz
- Pomorska Kolej Metropolitalna services (R) Kartuzy — Gdańsk Port Lotniczy (Airport) — Gdańsk Główny
- Pomorska Kolej Metropolitalna services (R) Kościerzyna — Gdańsk Port Lotniczy (Airport) — Gdańsk Wrzeszcz — Gdynia Główna

Preceding station	Polregio	Following station
Gdańsk Niedźwiednik towards Gdynia Główna	PR (Via Gdańsk Port Lotniczy (Airport))	Gdańsk Wrzeszcz Terminus
Gdańsk Wrzeszcz towards Gdańsk Główny	PR (Via Gdańsk Port Lotniczy (Airport))	Gdańsk Niedźwiednik towards Kartuzy
Gdańsk Jasień towards Kościerzyna	PR (Via Gdańsk Port Lotniczy (Airport) and Gdańsk Wrzeszcz)	Gdańsk Wrzeszcz towards Gdynia Główna

== Public transport ==
Tram stop Strzyża PKM is located close to the station. The following services call here:

2, 3, 4, 5, 6, 8, 9, 10, 11, 12, N4, N14
