= Gdańsk Osowa railway station =

Rail station in Poland

Coordinates: 54.4208°N 18.4519°E

Gdańsk Osowa
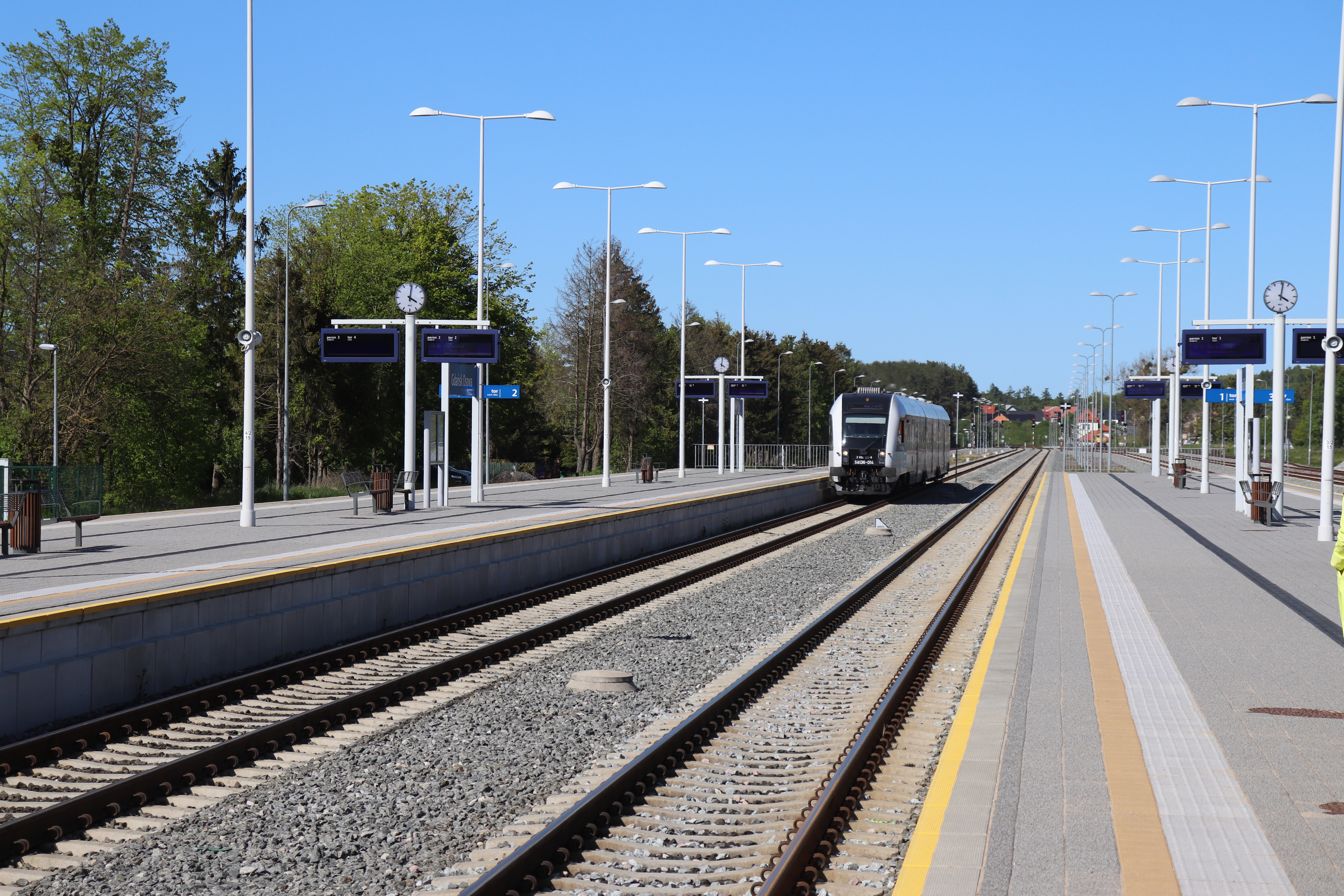
- Gdańsk Osowa railway station

General information
- Location: Osowa, Gdańsk, Pomeranian Voivodeship; Poland
- System: Railway Station
- Operator: SKM Tricity
- Lines: 201: Nowa Wieś Wielka–Gdynia Port railway 235: Gdańsk Kokoszki–Gdańsk Osowa railway (freight); 248: Gdańsk Wrzeszcz–Gdańsk Osowa railway
- Platforms: 4
- Tracks: 4

History
- Opened: 1930; 96 years ago
- Rebuilt: 2014–2015
Location
- Location within Poland

Gdańsk Osowa railway station is a railway station serving the Osowa district of Gdańsk, in the Pomeranian Voivodeship, Poland. The station opened in 1930 and is located on the Nowa Wieś Wielka–Gdynia Port railway, Gdańsk Kokoszki–Gdańsk Osowa railway and Gdańsk Wrzeszcz–Gdańsk Osowa railway. The train services are operated by SKM Tricity.

== Modernisation ==
Between 2014 and 2015 the station was modernised as part of the works for the Pomorska Kolej Metropolitalna.

== Train services ==
The station is served by the following services:

- Pomorska Kolej Metropolitalna services (R) Gdynia Główna — Gdańsk Osowa — Gdańsk Port Lotniczy (Airport) — Gdańsk Wrzeszcz
- Pomorska Kolej Metropolitalna services (R) Kościerzyna — Gdańsk Osowa — Gdynia Główna

Preceding station	Polregio	Following station
Gdynia Wielki Kack towards Gdynia Główna	PR (Via Gdańsk Port Lotniczy (Airport))	Gdańsk Rębiechowo (Airport) towards Gdańsk Wrzeszcz
Rębiechowo towards Kościerzyna	PR (Via Gdańsk Osowa)	Gdynia Wielki Kack towards Gdynia Główna
