= Gdańsk Kiełpinek railway station =

Railway station in Gdańsk, Poland

Coordinates: 54.3556°N 18.5281°E

Gdańsk Kiełpinek
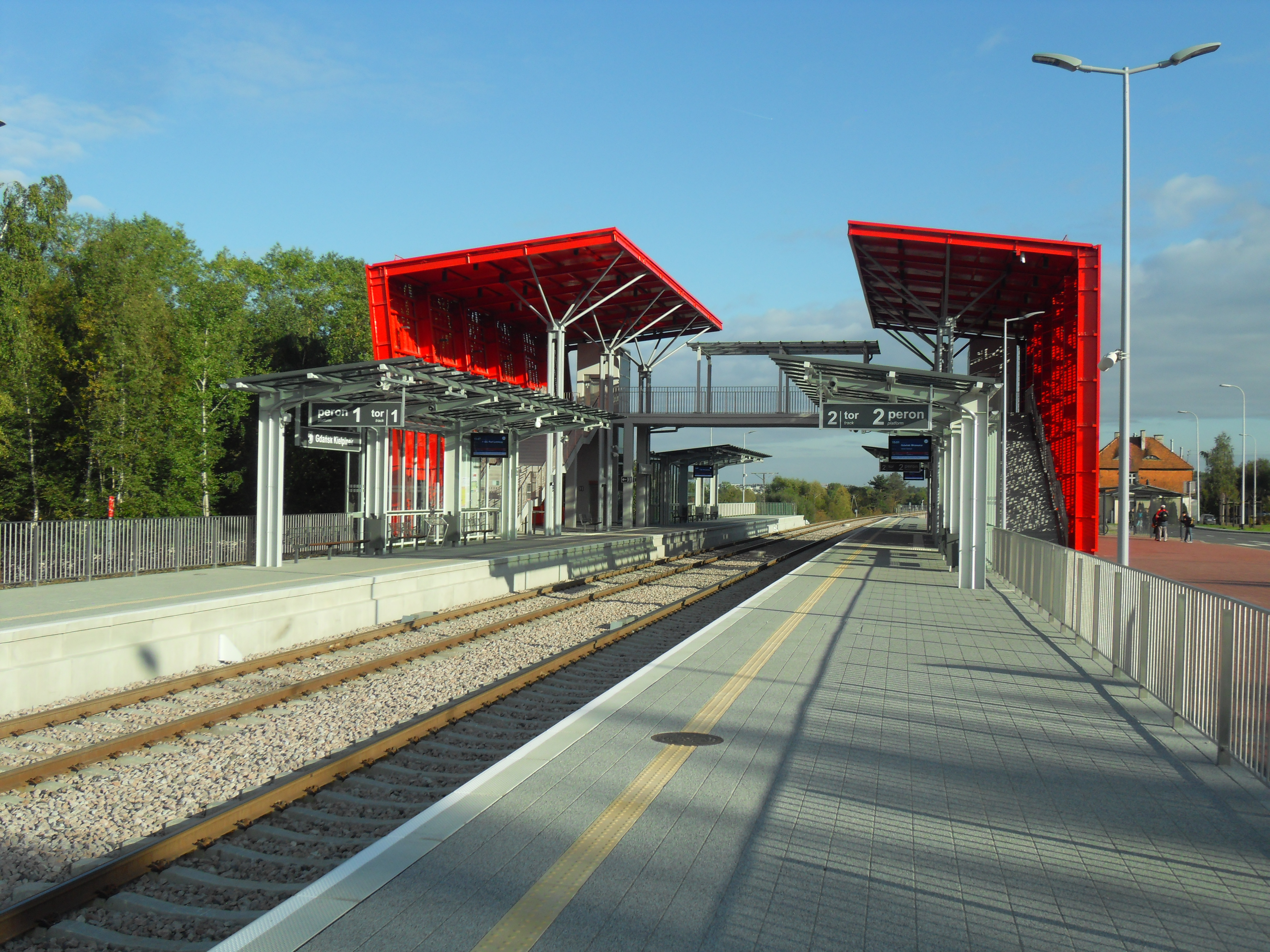
- Gdańsk Kiełpinek railway station

General information
- Location: Gdańsk, Pomeranian Voivodeship; Poland
- System: Railway Station
- Operator: SKM Tricity
- Line: 248: Gdańsk Wrzeszcz–Gdańsk Osowa railway
- Platforms: 2
- Tracks: 2

History
- Opened: 1 September 2015; 11 years ago
Location
- Location within Poland

Gdańsk Kiełpinek railway station is a railway station serving the city of Gdańsk, in the Pomeranian Voivodeship, Poland. The station opened on 1 September 2015 and is located on the Gdańsk Wrzeszcz–Gdańsk Osowa railway. The train services are operated by SKM Tricity as part of the Pomorska Kolej Metropolitalna (PKM).

== Train services ==
The station is served by the following services:

- Pomorska Kolej Metropolitalna services (R) Gdynia Główna — Gdańsk Osowa — Gdańsk Port Lotniczy (Airport) — Gdańsk Wrzeszcz
- Pomorska Kolej Metropolitalna services (R) Kartuzy — Gdańsk Port Lotniczy (Airport) — Gdańsk Główny
- Pomorska Kolej Metropolitalna services (R) Kościerzyna — Gdańsk Port Lotniczy (Airport) — Gdańsk Wrzeszcz — Gdynia Główna

Preceding station	Polregio	Following station
Gdańsk Matarnia towards Gdynia Główna	PR (Via Gdańsk Port Lotniczy (Airport))	Gdańsk Jasień towards Gdańsk Wrzeszcz
Gdańsk Jasień towards Gdańsk Główny	PR (Via Gdańsk Port Lotniczy (Airport))	Gdańsk Matarnia towards Kartuzy
Gdańsk Port Lotniczy (Airport) towards Kościerzyna	PR (Via Gdańsk Port Lotniczy (Airport) and Gdańsk Wrzeszcz)	Gdańsk Jasień towards Gdynia Główna

== Public transport ==
Bus services call at Kiełpinek PKM. The following services call here:

268
