= Kokoszki railway station =

Railway station in Kokoszki, Poland

Coordinates: 54°21′43″N 18°29′16″E

Kokoszki
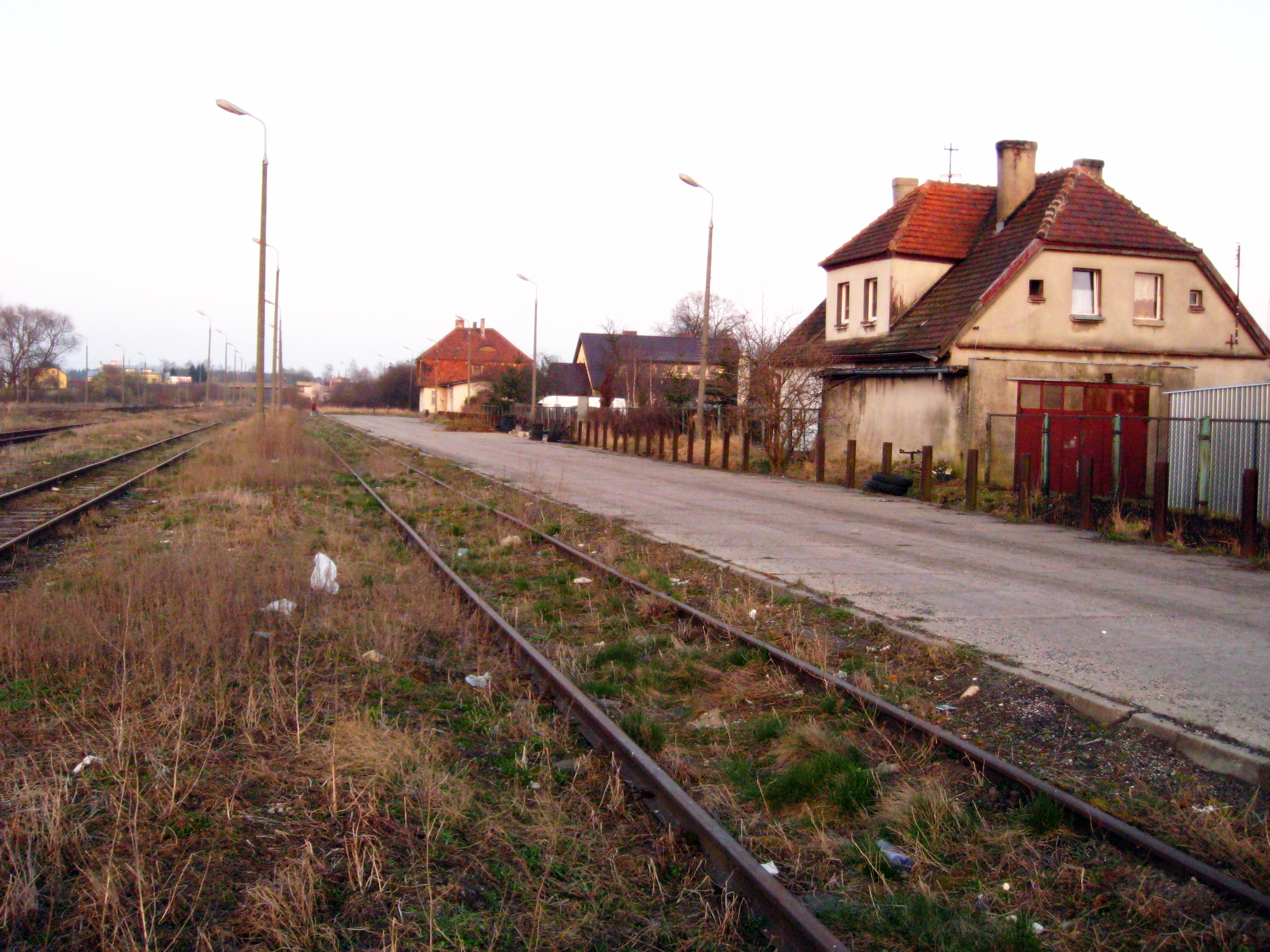

General information
- Location: Kokoszki; Poland
- Owner: Polskie Koleje Państwowe S.A.
- Platforms: 1

Construction
- Structure type: Building: Yes (no longer used since 1973); Depot: Yes; Water tower: Never existed

History
- Opened: 1914
- Former names: Kokoschken until 1945
Location

Kokoszki is a PKP railway station in Kokoszki (Pomeranian Voivodeship), Poland.

== Lines crossing the station ==
Start station	End station	Line type
Gdańsk Wrzeszcz	Stara Piła	Dismantled
Kokoszki	Gdańsk Osowa	Dismantled
