= Gdańsk Matarnia railway station =

Railway station in Gdańsk, Poland

Coordinates: 54.4°N 18.5°E

Gdańsk Matarnia
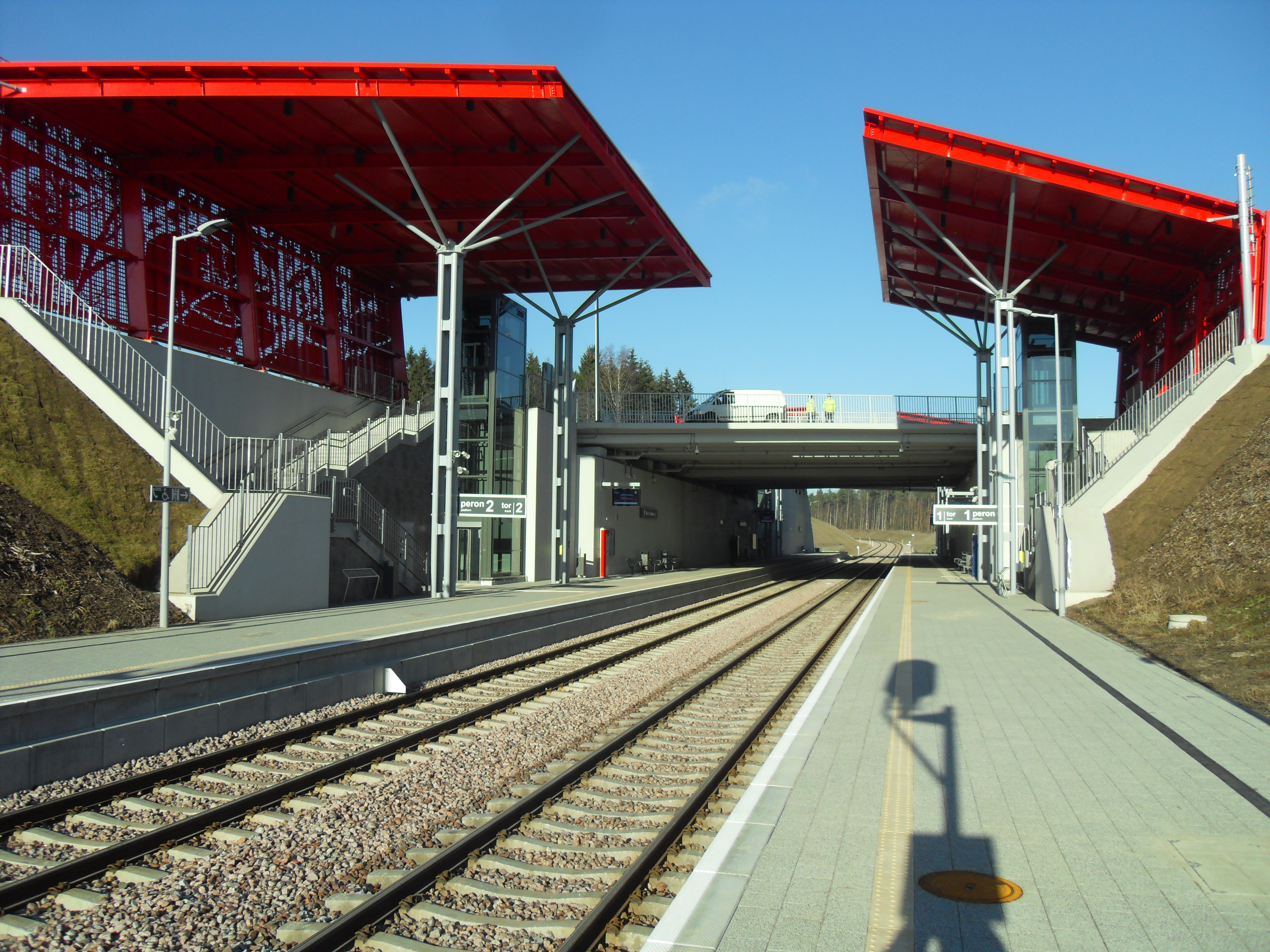
- Gdańsk Matarnia railway station

General information
- Location: Gdańsk, Pomeranian Voivodeship; Poland
- System: Railway Station
- Operator: SKM Tricity
- Line: 248: Gdańsk Wrzeszcz–Gdańsk Osowa railway
- Platforms: 2
- Tracks: 2

History
- Opened: 1 September 2015; 11 years ago
Location
- Location within Pomeranian Voivodeship Location within Poland

Gdańsk Matarnia railway station is a railway station serving the city of Gdańsk, in the Pomeranian Voivodeship, Poland. The station opened on 1 September 2015 and is located on the Gdańsk Wrzeszcz–Gdańsk Osowa railway. The train services are operated by SKM Tricity as part of the Pomorska Kolej Metropolitalna (PKM).

== Train services ==
The station is served by the following services:

- Pomorska Kolej Metropolitalna services (R) Gdynia Główna — Gdańsk Osowa — Gdańsk Port Lotniczy (Airport) — Gdańsk Wrzeszcz
- Pomorska Kolej Metropolitalna services (R) Kartuzy — Gdańsk Port Lotniczy (Airport) — Gdańsk Główny

Preceding station	Polregio	Following station
Gdańsk Port Lotniczy (Airport) towards Gdynia Główna	PR (Via Gdańsk Port Lotniczy (Airport))	Gdańsk Kiełpinek towards Gdańsk Wrzeszcz
Gdańsk Kiełpinek towards Gdańsk Główny	PR (Via Gdańsk Port Lotniczy (Airport))	Gdańsk Port Lotniczy (Airport) towards Kartuzy

== Public transport ==
Bus services call at Matarnia PKM. The following services call here:

120, 126, 157, N3
