= Pesa Atribo =

Diesel train

Pesa Atribo Pesa 219M
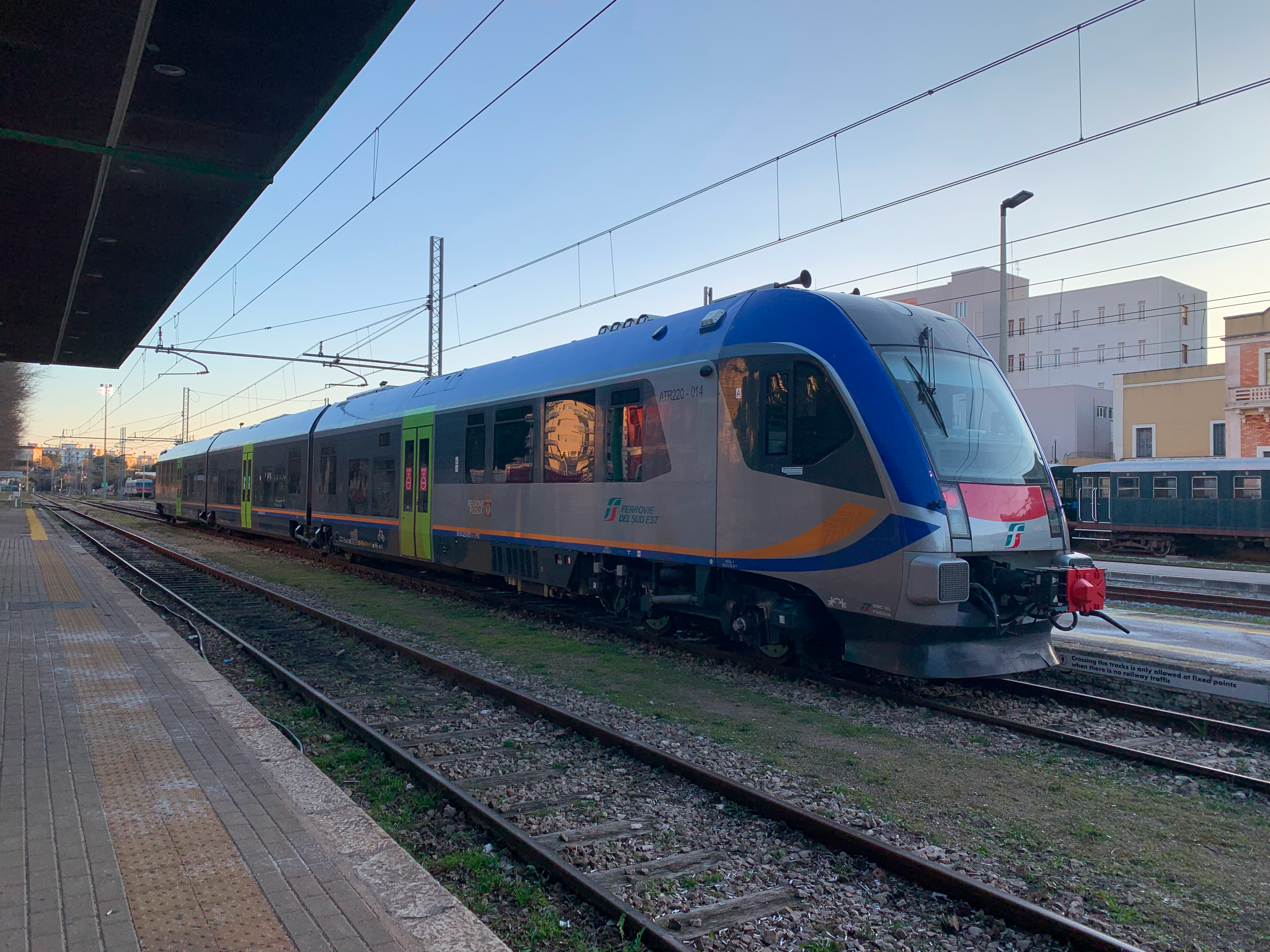
- Pesa Atribo at Martina Franca, Italy
- Manufacturer: Pesa SA
- Family name: Atribo
- Number built: 100
- Formation: 3-car

Specifications
- Train length: 55.57 m (182 ft 3 3/4 in)
- Maximum speed: 120–140 km/h (70–90 mph)
- Weight: 99–114 t (97.4–112.2 long tons; 109.1–125.7 short tons)
- Traction system: MAN D2876LUE623
- Track gauge: 1,435 mm (4 ft 8 1/2 in) standard gauge

The Pesa Atribo is an articulated diesel multiple unit for regional train services made by Pesa SA of Poland.

== Description ==
The Atribo is a development of the earlier Pesa 218M. It features a low floor and is designed for regional, non-electrified lines. The train features two toilets, one of which is accessible to disabled people. The trains can operate with up to three sets in multiple. The Italian version has 21 seats in first class (in the 2 + 1) and 129 fixed and 4 tip-up seats in the 2nd class. The Polish version is second class only having 150 fixed seats and 7 tip-up seats. Atribo is equipped with visual and acoustic passenger information system.

Trenitalia sets have a Voith engine, producing less noise and lower emissions.

== Usage ==
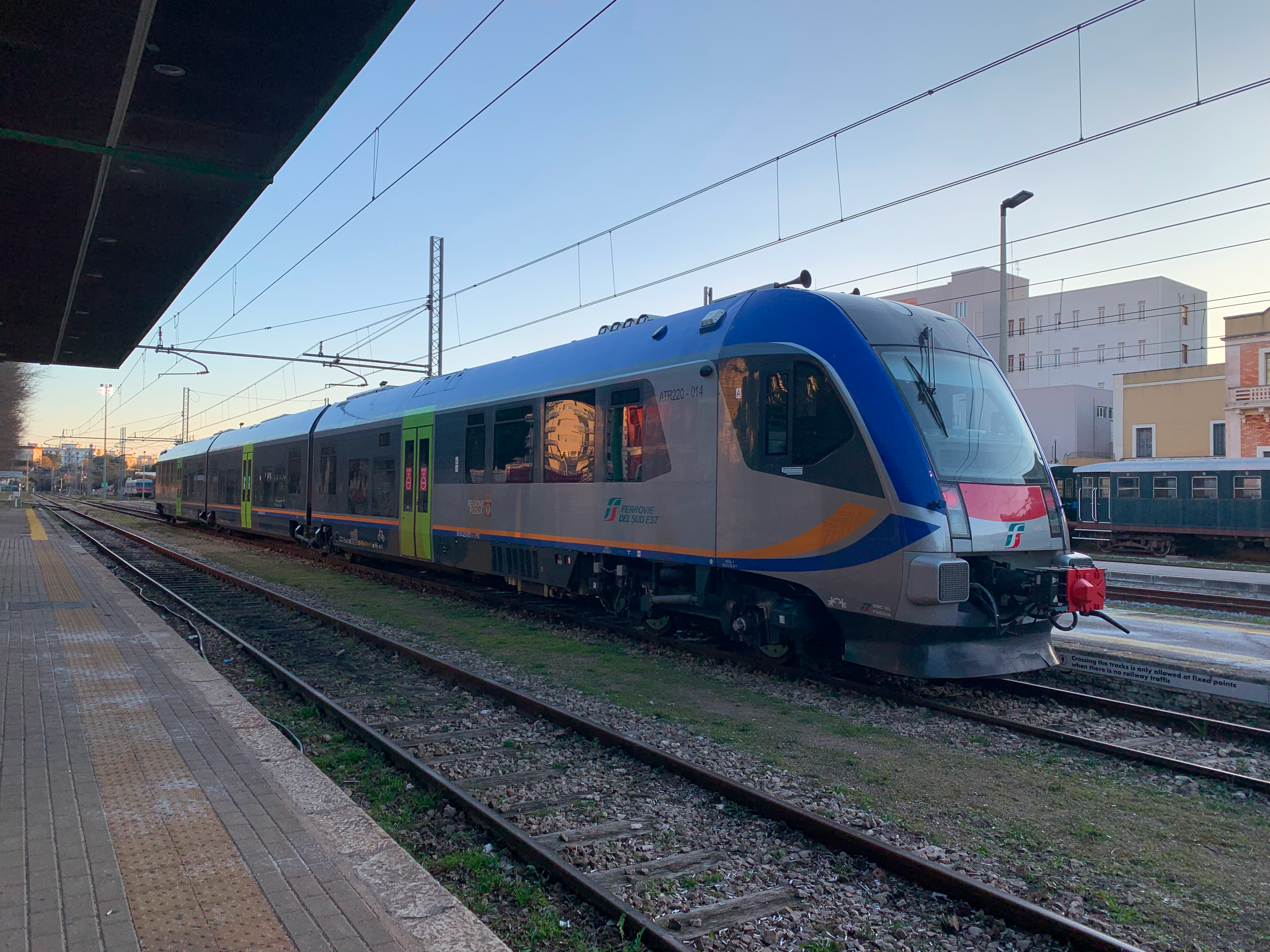
An FSE ATR 220.

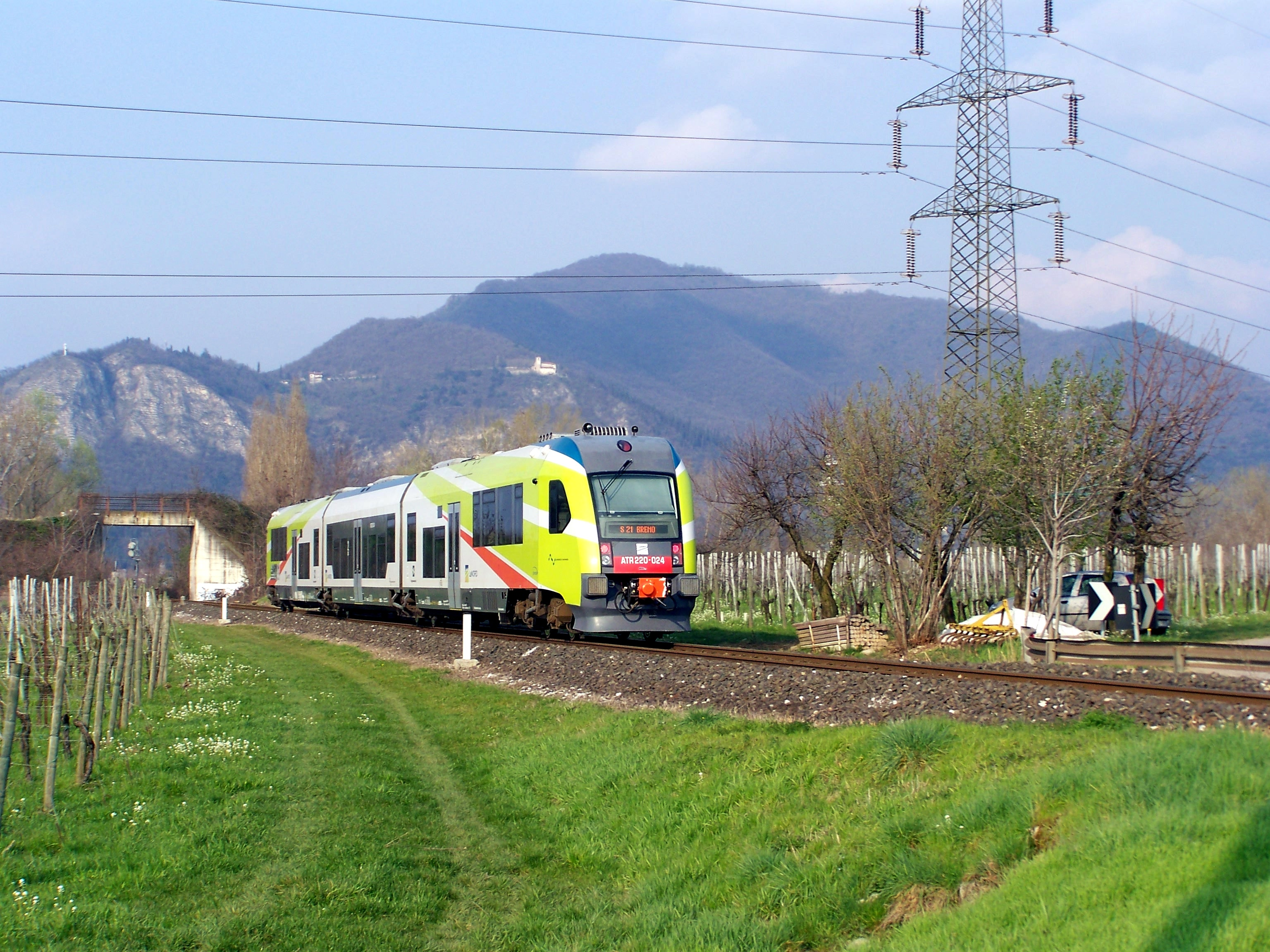
A Trenord ATR 220.

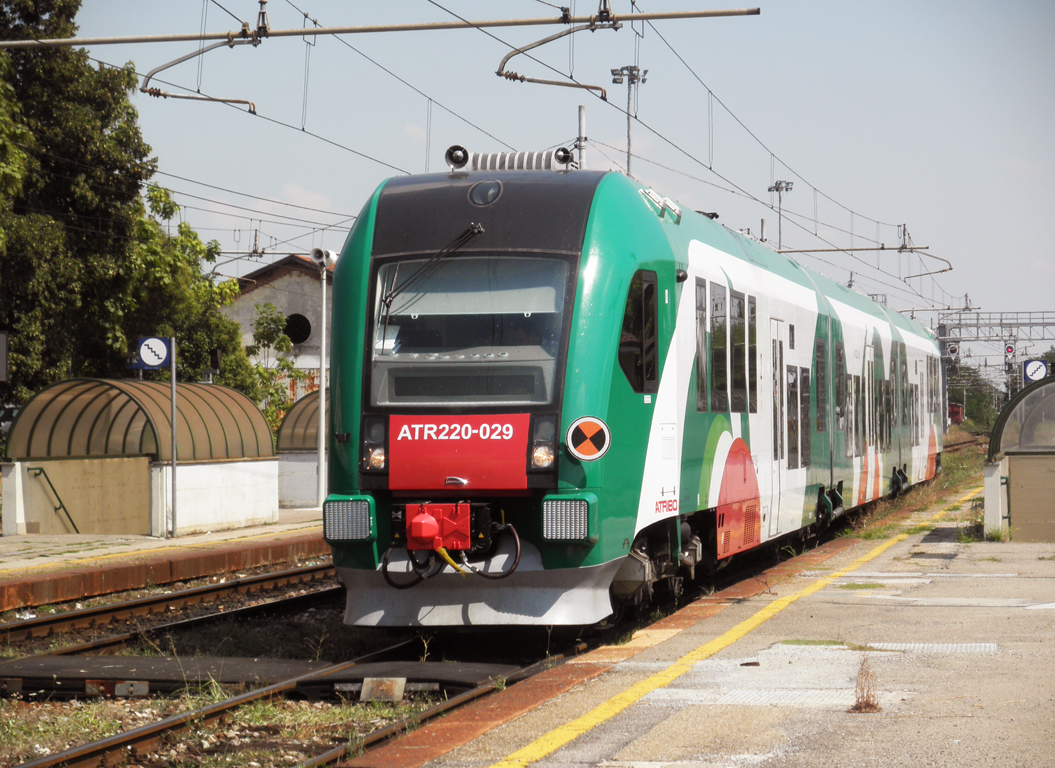
A FER ATR 220.

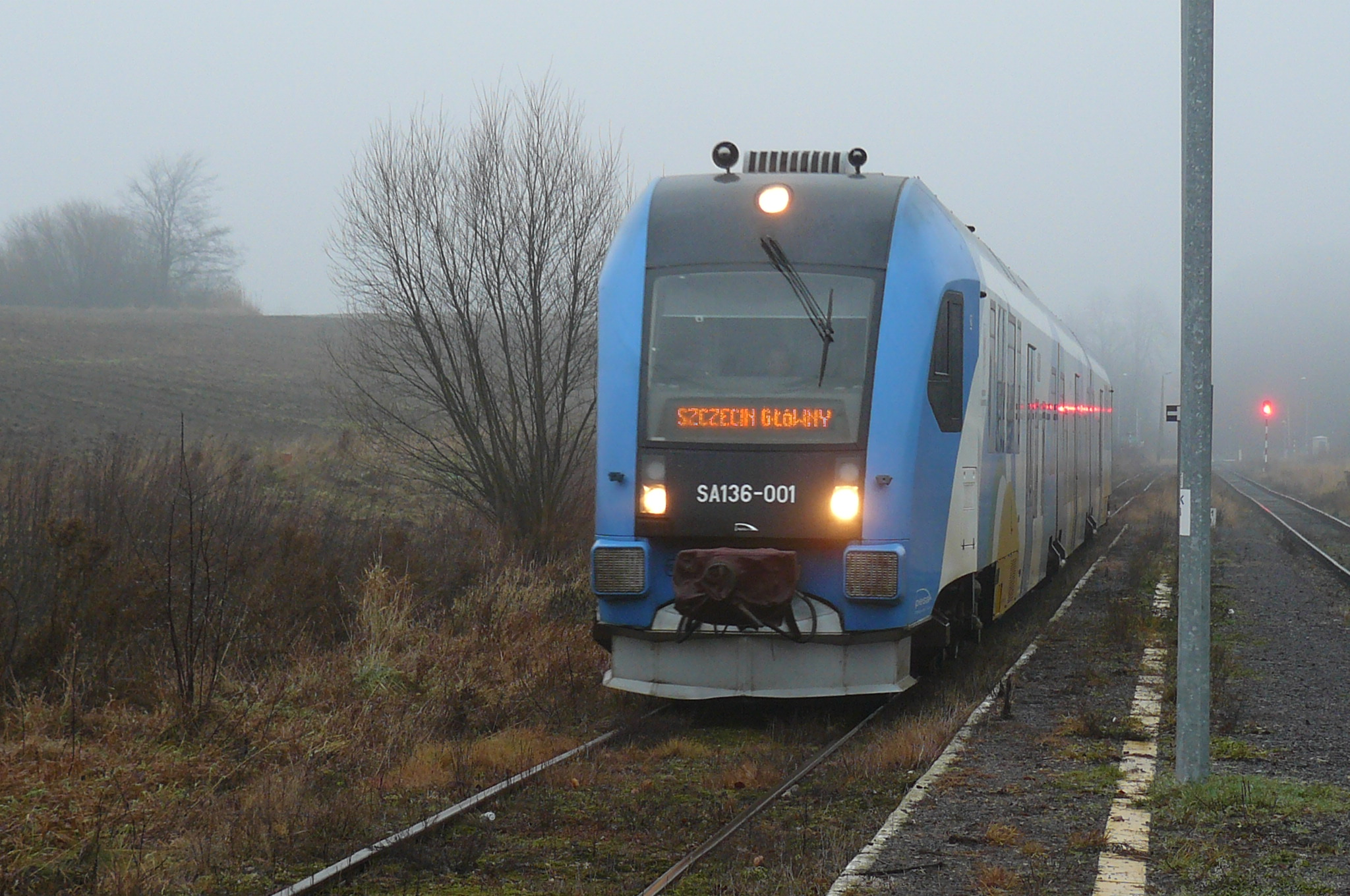
A Polish SA 136

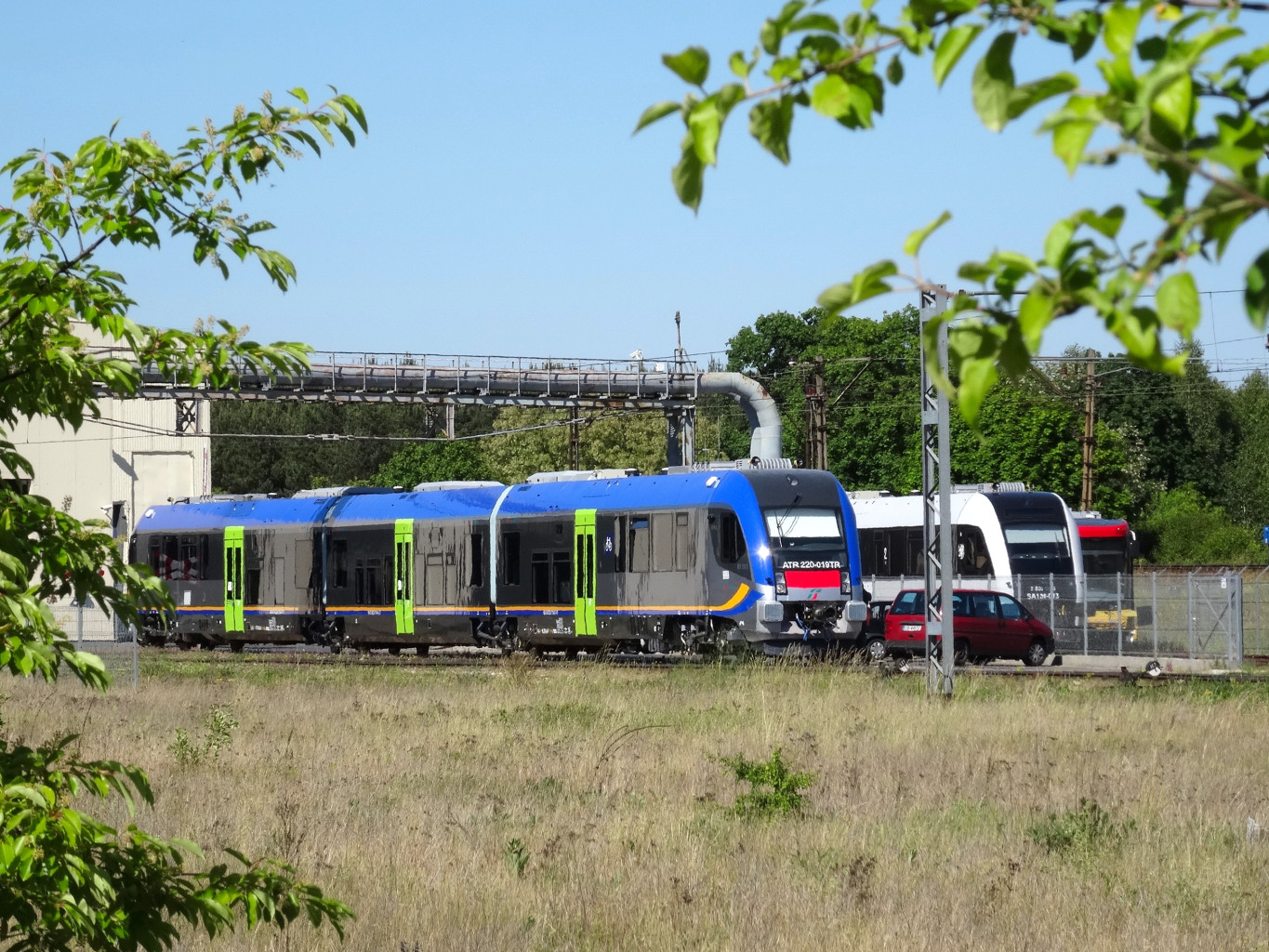
ATR 220Tr

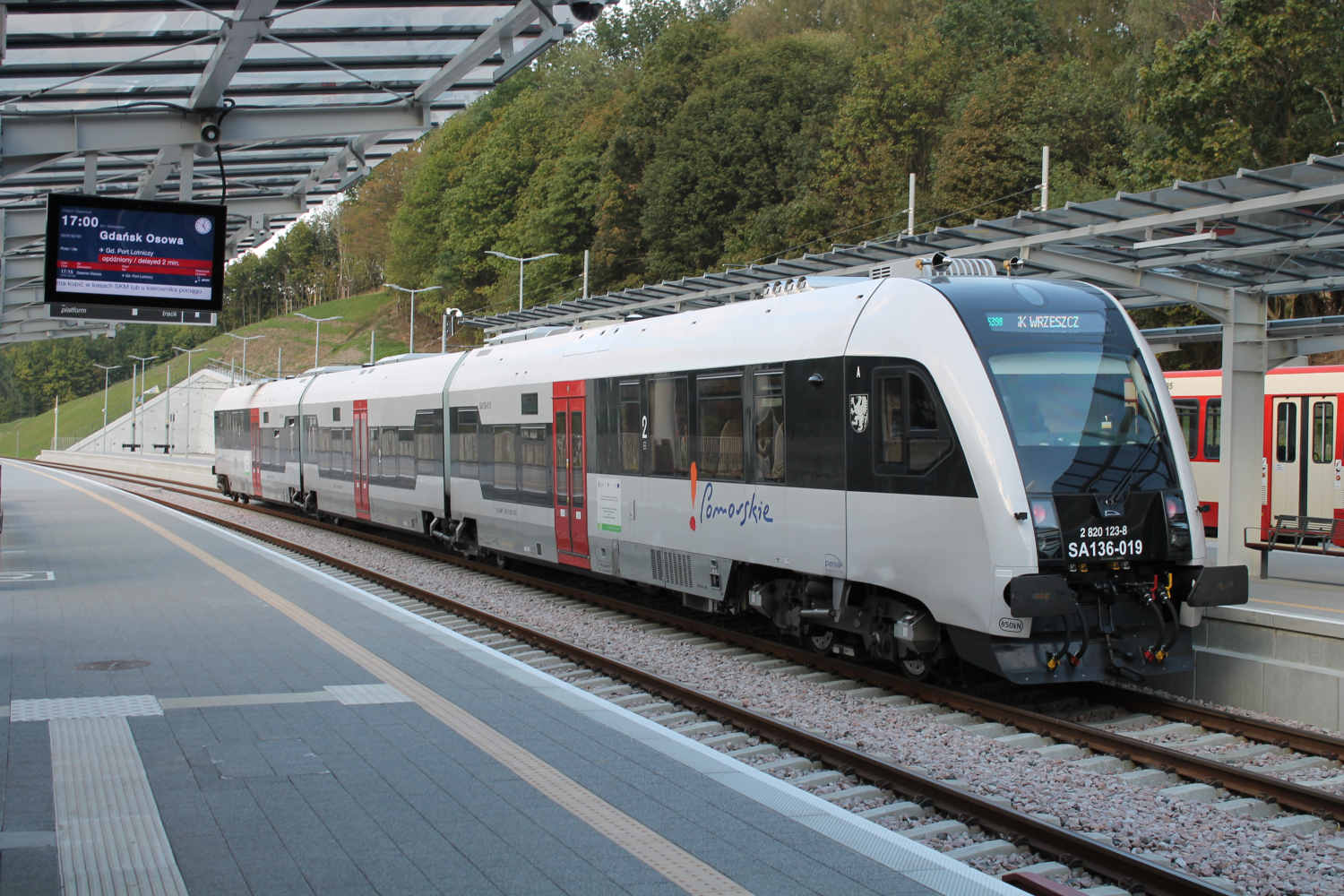
A Polish SA 136 of the Pomeranian Voivodeship

Country	Operator	Class	Amount	Year
Italy	Ferrovie del Sud Est (FSE)	ATR220	27 (001-027)	2008-2011
Italy	Trasporto Passeggeri Emilia-Romagna (TPER)	ATR220	12 (026-037)	2009-2010
Italy	Trenitalia	ATR220Tr	40 (001-058)	2014-2021
Poland	Polregio	SA136	12 (001-012)	2010
Poland	Polregio	SA136	7 (013-019)	2014
Poland	Greater Poland Railways	SA136-ATR	2 (001-002)	2009 (production) 2025 (use)

=== Ferrovie del Sud Est ===
The contract with the Ferrovie del Sud Est for the delivery of 13 Atribo sets was signed on 12 June 2006. On 26 February 2007 FSE, using the options included in the signed contract, expanded the order to 23 units. Deliveries began on 15 July 2008. In March 2010, signed a new contract for the next 4 sets.

FSE uses its Pesa Atribo's in the region of Apulia. They operate services around Bari, Martina Franca, Taranto and Lecce.

From 2019, and until 2023, they were subject to a revision through the application of the DPR livery and interior arrangement, following the Trenitalia schemes.

=== Ferrovie Nord Milano ===
FNM ordered two Pesa Atribo sets on 17 February 2009. They were handed over to the operator on 9 April 2009, in Brescia. The trains are allocated to operate the route Brescia - Iseo - Edolo. The DMUs were retired in 2020 and sold to a consortium of Modertrans Poznań and Public Transport Service. They arrived in Poland on 13 March 2024 and will be put into service on local routes after an overhaul.

=== Ferrovie Emilia Romagna / Trasporto Passeggeri Emilia-Romagna ===
On 19 May 2009 a contract was signed with the Ferrovie Emilia Romagna for eight Atribo sets to operate on the Bologna - Portomaggiore and Casalecchio - Vignola lines. The first three sets were delivered on 25 June 2009. Later, an agreement was signed for the delivery of four additional units.

=== West Pomeranian Voivodeship ===
The region signed an agreement on 29 January 2010, for the purchase of 10 Atribo sets with the option of adding another two units, of which the options were taken up in September 2010. The first two units were delivered on 25 and 27 June 2010, and started their operation in the West Pomeranian Regional Transport Department. Further units were delivered at a rate of one or two a month until 28 January 2011.

Vehicles are assigned to the depot in Kolobrzeg. Trains were allocated primarily to operate the Szczecin - Kolobrzeg (- Koszalin) and Szczecin - Szczecinek services. Vehicles occasionally operate the Koszalin - Mielno Koszalin route, supported mainly by Class SA103 and Slawno - Darlowo supported mainly by Classes SA109 and SA110. In case of failure of Western Pomeranian Class EN57, Atribo sets replace them on the electrified routes such as Szczecin - Białogard, Szczecin - Gryfino and Szczecin - Kamien Pomorski. Since 29 August 2012 Atribo are also used on the line Szczecin - Piła and since June 2013 also to Szczecin Airport Goleniów (on the route from Szczecin to Kolobrzeg).

=== Trenitalia ===
On 12 December 2013 Pesa a contract signed in Rome with Trenitalia for the supply of 40 Atribo sets with the option to purchase an additional 20. Transfer of the first unit for the Italian national carrier took place in November 2014 and the end of the supply is scheduled for July 2015. At the end of July 2014, the first vehicle was tested on an experimental track Railway Institute near Żmigród, and it was delivered on 20 August to Pisa and allocated to the tests necessary to release these vehicles to move around on the Italian railway network. On 4 December 2014, the official presentation of the unit was held at Roma Termini.

Units were purchased to replace older units with the aim to replace old ALn 668 series and ALn 663, and operate in the regions of Tuscany, Abruzzo, Calabria, Marche and Veneto. The units are known by Trenitalia as Swing. As at December 2015 32 of the 40 units have been delivered.

=== Pomeranian Voivodeship ===
On 2 September 2014 the Pomeranian government signed a contract for the supply from Pesa of 7 Atribo sets and 2 Pesa 218Mc sets operate on the Pomeranian Metropolitan Railway. The trains entered service with the inauguration of the metropolitan railway on 1 September 2015. After the line was electrified, they were replaced by Newag Impuls trainsets and redirected to operating local routes in the Pomeranian Voivodeship.

== See also ==
- Pesa SA
