= Pomeranian Metropolitan Railway =

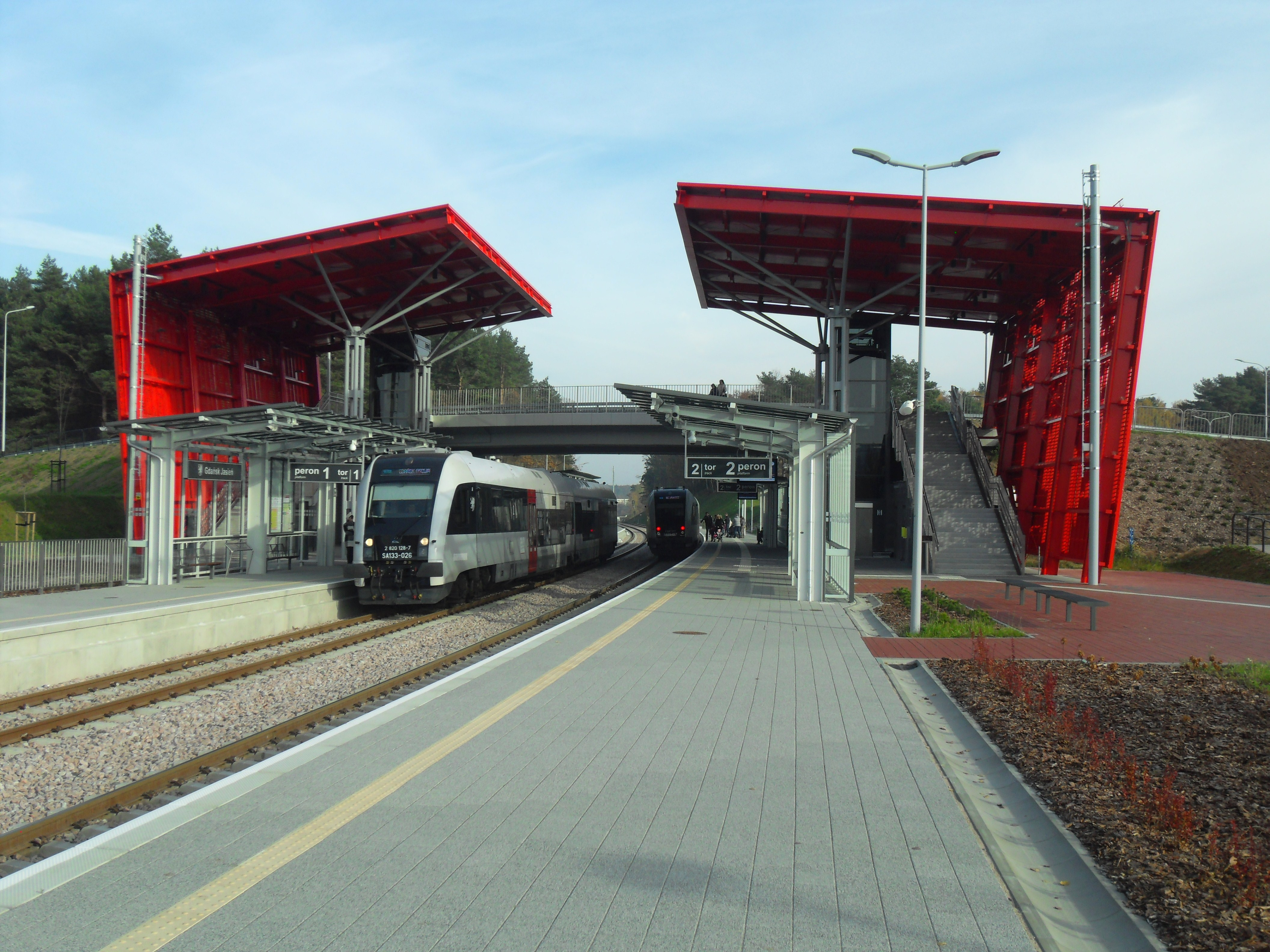
- The Gdańsk Jasień railway station

Overview
- Status: operational
- Owner: PKP PLK and PKM
- Line number: 248, 253, 234
- Locale: Tricity region
- Termini: Gdańsk Osowa; Gdańsk Wrzeszcz
- Stations: 11
- Website: pkm-sa.pl

Service
- Operator: Polregio

History
- Opened: 1 September 2015

Technical
- Line length: 19.5 km (12.1 mi)
- Number of tracks: 2
- Track gauge: 1,435 mm (4 ft 8 1/2 in) standard gauge
- Electrification: 3 kV DC (since 2023)
- Operating speed: 120 km/h (75 mph)
- Train protection system: ETCS level 2

The Pomeranian Metropolitan Railway (Polish: Pomorska Kolej Metropolitalna; PKM) is a company that owns commuter rail line in the Tricity area, in northern Poland. Founded in 2010, it began hosting scheduled rail service on the reconstructed Gdańsk Wrzeszcz–Gdańsk Osowa railway on 1 September 2015.

== History ==
=== Origins and background ===
The Gdańsk Wrzeszcz–Gdańsk Osowa railway, initially constructed from 1911 to 1914, at first connected the area of Kokoszki and Wrzeszcz. In 1945, during the Siege of Danzig, the line was intentionally destroyed by retreating German soldiers. For much of its history thereafter, the area around the destroyed railway remained unserved by rail, and many of the line's remaining sections were taken apart. In 1974, Gdańsk Lech Wałęsa Airport opened, initially being served by city buses.

Initial feasibility studies for rebuilding the destroyed railway, in a form wherein it linked the city's airport to the city proper, were carried out between 2005 and 2009, with the company known as the Pomeranian Metropolitan Railway being founded on 1 June 2010. The railway was initially planned to be rebuilt by UEFA Euro 2012.

=== Construction ===
Work on constructing the railway began on 3 January 2013 in Matarnia and Kokoszki, initially largely focused on clearing the way for the railway by demolishing buildings obstructing its likely route. These demolitions were complete by 28 February. On 7 March, the contractors responsible for constructing the railway were revealed, a consortium of the companies Budimex and Ferrovial, who promised the lowest price for the investment, equal to 716 million zł.

On 7 May, a formal contract was signed between the Pomeranian Metropolitan Railway and the consortium, encompassing the construction of a double-track railway from Gdańsk Wrzeszcz to Gdańsk Osowa, a single-track railway connecting the double-track line to the Nowa Wieś Wielka–Gdynia Port railway, 8 passenger stations, a technical and repair station, a traffic control centre, as well as 16 rail viaducts, 8 road viaducts, 5 overpasses, as well as several level crossings for people and animals and an ERTMS system.

The line's construction was formally initiated on 1 July 2013. Demolition works concluded on 18 August, and the first tracks were being laid by 11 December. The names of the stations located along the railway were finalized on 29 April 2014. On 22 July, the railway's rolling stock was formally announced, being bought from Pesa, following a failed deal with Newag. On 12 September, the tracks of the railway were first used, with a draisine moving along them near the Gdańsk Niedźwiednik station. Load testing of the railway's viaducts began on 17 October 2014.

From 20 to 24 April 2015, the line's first higher-speed tests were conducted, using Alstom Traxx locomotives loaned by Lotos Kolej. On 3 July 2015, the Pomeranian Metropolitan Railway company moved to new headquarters in Matarnia, by Gdańsk Matarnia station, and was formally reviewed as safe for passenger service on 13 August. The line was ceremonially opened on 31 August, with trains moving between the Gdańsk Strzyża and Gdańsk Port Lotniczy railway stations, and passenger service began on 1 September.

=== Later developments ===
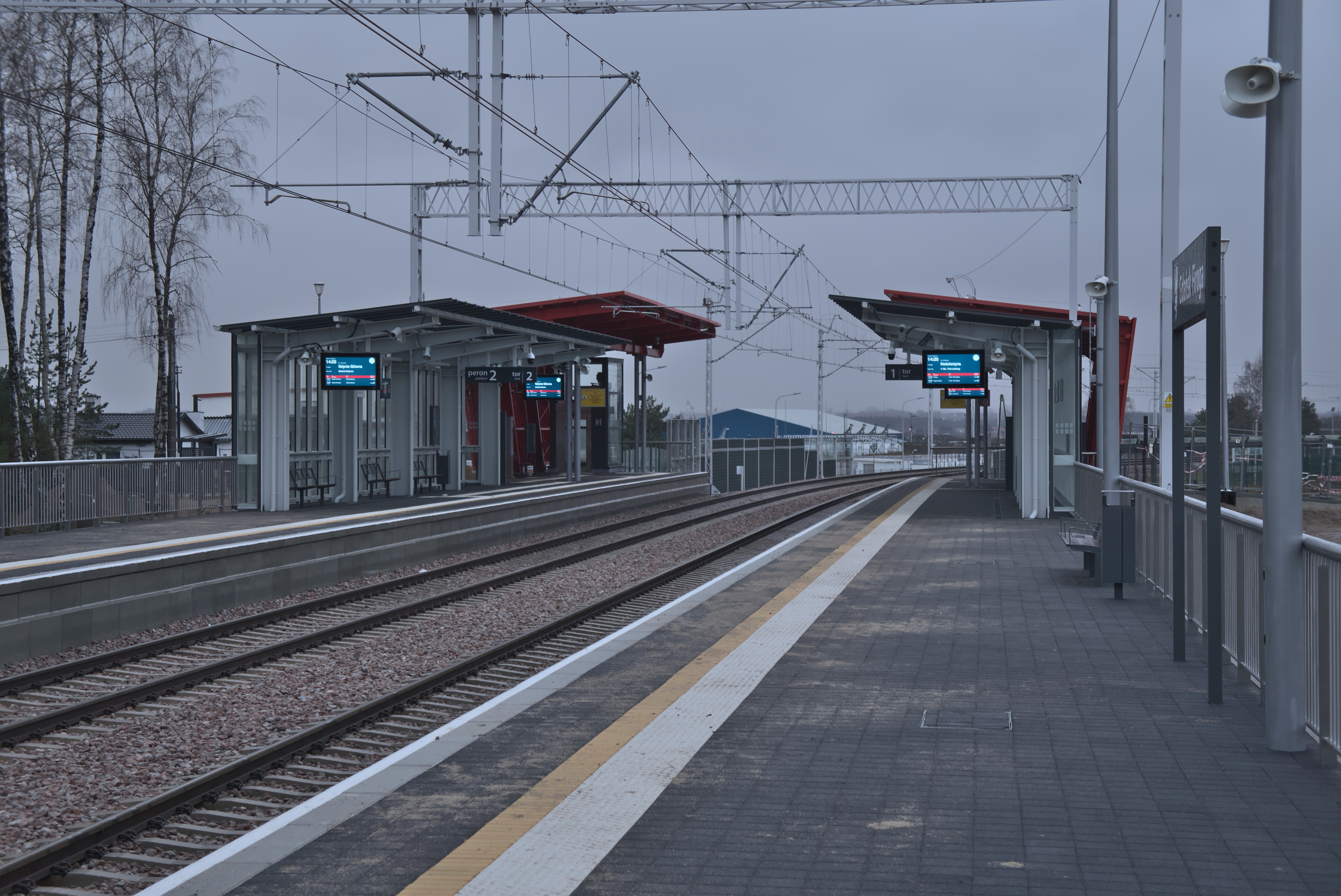
Gdańsk Firoga station, completed in 2022

The PKM was extended to Kartuzy on 1 October 2015. On 29 December 2015, the Railway's owners began a public auction to determine who would execute the construction of two new stations in Gdynia; the contract for this project was awarded to Ferrovial and Budimex, who had also been responsible for the construction of the rest of the main line, on 22 September 2016, and the two stations, namely Gdynia Karwiny and Gdynia Stadion, were opened on 8 December 2017. On 30 May 2018, the Pomeranian Metropolitan Railway received 62 million zł in European Union funding to electrify its main line and construct a new station, Gdańsk Firoga. The station opened on 11 December 2022.

In May 2018, a letter of intent was signed in Kartuzy regarding the reconstruction of a railway link to Gdańsk via Stara Piła as part of the Nowa Wieś Wielka–Gdynia Port railway. This project, colloquially named the Kartuzy bypass (Polish: bajpas kartuski), saw preparation work initiate in February 2019. On 6 May 2019, an initial auction was held for the construction contract of the Kartuzy bypass, with auction actions concluding on 10 December 2020. The companies PHU Rajbud and Torhamer were awarded the contracts for a broader reconstruction of the line, and the PKM's construction contract was signed with Torhamer on 22 December 2020. On 6 January 2022, the Pomeranian voivode officially approved the Kartuzy bypass revitalization process. The first train moved onto the tracks of the Kartuzy bypass on 17 November 2023, and on 11 March 2024, regular passenger service began on the bypass.

Following a second auction, a contract was signed with the company Torpol on 30 April 2021 concerning the electrification of the PKM's lines, and electrification work began on 15 June 2021. On the night of 20–21 April 2022, overhead lines were installed by workers above the PKM network, with the first test runs of electric multiple unit (EMU) trains on the line occurring overnight between 8 and 9 November 2022. On 23 May 2023, electrification work concluded, and the first EMUs were released for scheduled passenger service on the line on 12 June.

Initial plans for the construction of a new branch of the PKM's network – PKM Południe – were formalized in a 2020 feasibility study regarding such a project. In June 2021, a formal construction contract and future auction was announced, and an auction for the contract being awarded did occur in 2024; the companies awarded the contract on 28 June that year were Infra – Centrum Doradztwa, Mosty Gdańsk, and Biuro Projektów Komunikacyjnych w Poznaniu. The final decision to go forward with the project made on 11 March 2025, with an expected cost of 2.3 billion zł and a length of 7.5 kilometres (4.7 mi).

== Routes and stations ==
The Pomeranian Metropolitan Railway company itself owns 9 stations between Gdańsk Wrzeszcz and Gdańsk Osowa stations, along with the railway line connecting them. The railway is connected to neighbouring lines, leading to Gdańsk Główny, Kartuzy, Kościerzyna, and Gdynia Główna; these lines are owned by the Polish State Railways. Polregio is the sole operator of passenger trains on the line. Four rail lines operate on the PKM line: Kościerzyna – Gdańsk Osowa – Gdynia Główna, Kościerzyna – Gdańsk Wrzeszcz – Gdynia Główna, Gdańsk Główny – Kartuzy, and Gdańsk Wrzeszcz – Gdańsk Port Lotniczy – Gdynia Główna.

== Rolling stock ==
Up to 2023, the PKM was served by diesel multiple unit trains provided by Pesa such as the Pesa Atribo. After an extensive electrification effort in 2022 and 2023, in the latter year, electric multiple unit EN57 trains operated by Polregio began passenger service on the line.
