= Gdańsk Port Lotniczy railway station =

Railway station in Gdańsk, Poland

Coordinates: 54.3825°N 18.4672°E

Gdańsk Port Lotniczy
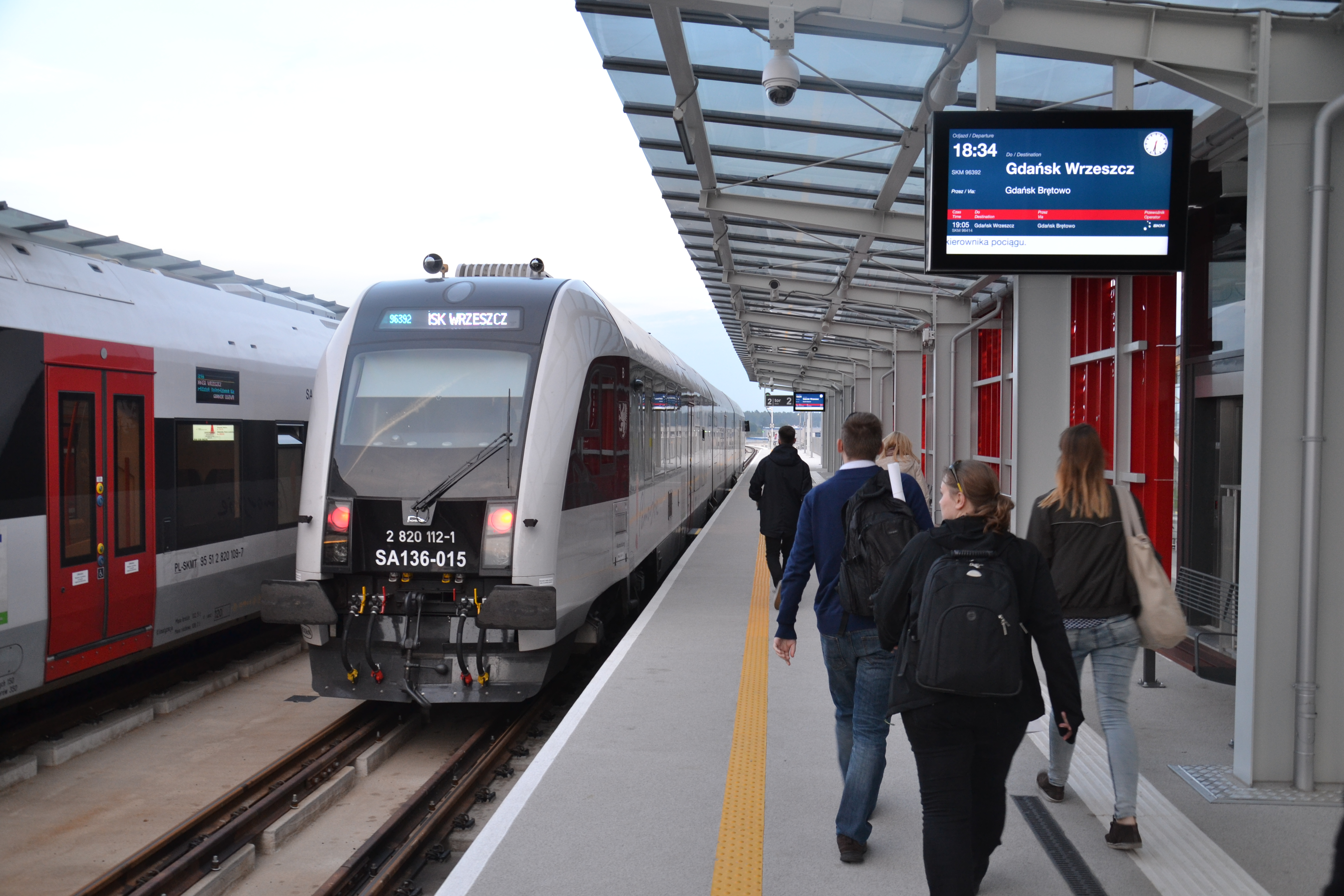
- Gdańsk Port Lotniczy railway station

General information
- Location: Gdańsk, Pomeranian Voivodeship; Poland
- Owner: Polish State Railways
- Operator: Tricity Rapid Urban Railway
- Line: Gdańsk Wrzeszcz–Gdańsk Osowa railway
- Platforms: 2

History
- Opened: 1 September 2015
Location
- Location within Poland Location within Pomeranian Voivodeship

Gdańsk Port Lotniczy (lit. 'Gdańsk Airport') is a railway station serving the Gdańsk Lech Wałęsa Airport in the city of Gdańsk, in the Pomeranian Voivodeship, of northern Poland.

The station opened on 1 September 2015 and is located on the Gdańsk Wrzeszcz–Gdańsk Osowa railway. The train services are operated by the Tricity Rapid Urban Railway as part of the Pomeranian Metropolitan Railway.

== Train services ==
The station is served by the following services:

- Pomorska Kolej Metropolitalna services (R) Gdynia Główna — Gdańsk Osowa — Gdańsk Port Lotniczy (Airport) — Gdańsk Wrzeszcz
- Pomorska Kolej Metropolitalna services (R) Kartuzy — Gdańsk Port Lotniczy (Airport) — Gdańsk Główny
- Pomorska Kolej Metropolitalna services (R) Kościerzyna — Gdańsk Port Lotniczy (Airport) — Gdańsk Wrzeszcz — Gdynia Główna

Preceding station	Polregio	Following station
Gdańsk Rębiechowo towards Gdynia Główna	PR (Via Gdańsk Port Lotniczy (Airport))	Gdańsk Matarnia towards Gdańsk Wrzeszcz
Gdańsk Matarnia towards Gdańsk Główny	PR (Via Gdańsk Port Lotniczy (Airport))	Gdańsk Rębiechowo towards Kartuzy
Żukowo Wschodnie towards Kościerzyna	PR (Via Gdańsk Port Lotniczy (Airport) and Gdańsk Wrzeszcz)	Gdańsk Kiełpinek towards Gdynia Główna

== Public transport ==
Bus services call at Port Lotniczy. The following services call here:

110, 120, 210, N3
