= Tczew railway station =

Railway station in Tczew, Poland

Coordinates: 54.0970°N 18.7893°E

Tczew
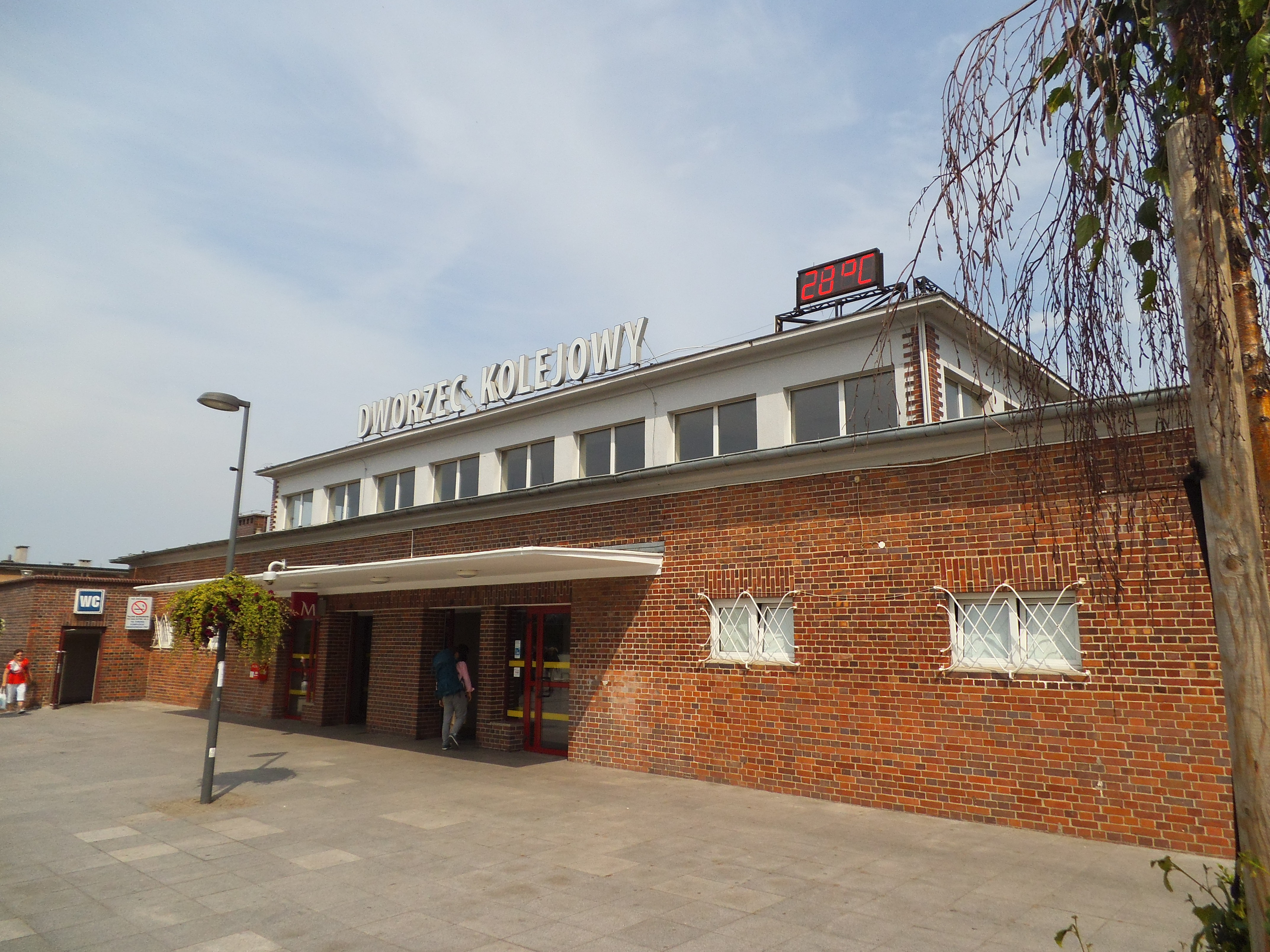
- Old Tczew railway station

General information
- Location: Tczew, Pomeranian Voivodeship; Poland
- System: Railway station
- Operator: PKP Polskie Linie Kolejowe
- Lines: 9: Warsaw–Gdańsk railway 131: Chorzów–Tczew railway 203: Tczew–Kostrzyn railway
- Platforms: 7

History
- Opened: 6 August 1852; 174 years ago
- Rebuilt: 2009–2012, 2020–2021
Services
Preceding station	PKP Intercity	Following station
Bydgoszcz Główna towards Berlin Hbf	EuroCity EC 95; IC	Gdańsk Główny towards Gdynia Główna
Malbork towards Wien Hbf	EuroCity IC	Gdańsk Główny towards Gdynia Główna
Gdańsk Główny towards Gdynia Główna	EIP	Malbork towards Warszawa Centralna
Gdańsk Główny towards Gdynia Główna	EIP	Malbork towards Gliwice or Bielsko-Biała Główna
Gdańsk Główny towards Gdynia Główna or Kołobrzeg	EIP	Malbork towards Kraków Główny or Rzeszów Główny
Gdańsk Główny towards Gdynia Główna	IC	Laskowice Pomorskie towards Przemyśl Główny
Pruszcz Gdański towards Gdynia Główna	IC	Smętowo towards Bielsko-Biała Główna
Pruszcz Gdański towards Gdynia Główna	IC (Via Bydgoszcz, Łódź)	Smętowo towards Zakopane
Pruszcz Gdański towards Gdynia Główna	IC	Laskowice Pomorskie towards Zielona Góra Główna
Gdańsk Główny towards Gdynia Główna	IC	Laskowice Pomorskie towards Wrocław Główny
Gdańsk Główny towards Kołobrzeg	IC	Malbork towards Łódź Fabryczna
Gdańsk Główny towards Szczecin Główny	IC	Malbork towards Olsztyn Główny
Gdańsk Główny towards Szczecin Główny	IC	Malbork towards Białystok
Gdańsk Główny towards Gdynia Główna	TLK	Starogard Gdański towards Kostrzyn
Gdańsk Główny towards Gdynia Główna	TLK (Via Warsaw)	Malbork towards Zakopane
Gdańsk Główny towards Kołobrzeg	TLK	Malbork towards Kraków Główny
Preceding station	Polregio	Following station
Pszczółki towards Gdynia Główna, Gdynia Chylonia or Słupsk	PR	Terminus
Miłobądz towards Gdynia Główna, Gdynia Chylonia or Słupsk	PR	Lisewo towards Malbork
Miłobądz towards Gdynia Główna, Gdynia Chylonia or Słupsk	PR	Lisewo towards Elbląg
Pszczółki towards Gdynia Chylonia	PR	Szymankowo towards Olsztyn Główny
Terminus	PR	Czarlin towards Smętowo
Miłobądz towards Gdynia Główna, Gdynia Chylonia or Słupsk	PR	Czarlin towards Smętowo, Laskowice Pomorskie, or Bydgoszcz Główna
Terminus	PR	Lisewo towards Grudziądz or Kwidzyn
Terminus	PR	Rokitki Tczewskie towards Chojnice
Gdańsk Orunia towards Gdynia Główna	PR	Swarożyn towards Chojnice
Location
- Location within Poland

Tczew, colloquially known as Dworzec Tczewski is a railway station serving the town of Tczew, in the Pomeranian Voivodeship, Poland. The station opened in 1852 and is located on the Warsaw–Gdańsk railway, Chorzów–Tczew railway and Tczew–Kostrzyn railway. The train services are operated by PKP and Polregio. Masovian Railways trains operate here during the summer.

This is an important station for passenger and freight traffic. It is a category A station. Every year more than 2.5 million passengers use the station.

The station used to be known as Dirschau.

== Modernisation ==
In the period 2009–2012, the station, as part of the modernization of European route E65, underwent a thorough modernisation which included rebuilding the platforms, renewing the tracks and the signalling system.

== Train services ==
The station is served by the following services:

- EuroCity services (EC) (EC 95 by DB) (IC by PKP) Gdynia - Gdansk - Bydgoszcz - Poznan - Rzepin - Frankfurt (Oder) - Berlin
- EuroCity services (EC) Gdynia - Gdansk - Malbork - Warsaw - Katowice - Bohumin - Ostrava - Prerov - Breclav - Vienna
- Express Intercity Premium services (EIP) Gdynia - Warsaw
- Express Intercity Premium services (EIP) Gdynia - Warsaw - Katowice - Gliwice/Bielsko-Biała
- Express Intercity Premium (EIP) services Gdynia - Gdansk - Warsaw - Krakow - Zakopane
- Express Intercity Premium services (EIP) Gdynia/Kołobrzeg - Warsaw - Kraków (- Rzeszów)
- Intercity services (IC) Gdynia - Gdansk - Bydgoszcz - Poznań - Wrocław - Opole - Katowice - Kraków - Rzeszów - Przemyśl
- Intercity services (IC) Gdynia - Gdańsk - Bydgoszcz - Toruń - Kutno - Łódź - Częstochowa - Katowice - Bielsko-Biała
- Intercity services (IC) Gdynia - Gdańsk - Bydgoszcz - Łódź - Czestochowa — Krakow — Zakopane
- Intercity services (IC) Gdynia - Gdańsk - Bydgoszcz - Poznań - Zielona Góra
- Intercity services (IC) Gdynia - Gdańsk - Bydgoszcz - Poznań - Wrocław
- Intercity services (IC) Łódź Fabryczna — Warsaw — Gdańsk Glowny — Kołobrzeg
- Intercity services (IC) Szczecin - Koszalin - Słupsk - Gdynia - Gdańsk - Elbląg/Iława - Olsztyn
- Intercity services (IC) Szczecin - Koszalin - Słupsk - Gdynia - Gdańsk - Elbląg - Olsztyn - Białystok
- Intercity services (TLK) Gdynia Główna — Kostrzyn
- Intercity services (TLK) Gdynia Główna — Warsaw — Krakow — Zakopane
- Intercity services (TLK) Kołobrzeg — Gdynia Główna — Warszawa Wschodnia — Kraków Główny
- Regional services (R) Tczew — Gdynia Chylonia
- Regional services (R) Tczew — Słupsk
- Regional services (R) Malbork — Słupsk
- Regional services (R) Malbork — Gdynia Chylonia
- Regional services (R) Chojnice — Czarna Woda - Starogard Gdanski - Tczew
- Regional services (R) Chojnice — Tczew — Gdynia Główna
- Regional services (R) Elbląg — Gdynia Chylonia
- Regional services (R) Elbląg — Słupsk
- Regional services (R) Gdynia Chylonia — Olsztyn Główny
- Regional services (R) Tczew — Smętowo
- Regional services (R) Gdynia Chylonia — Smętowo
- Regional services (R) Gdynia Chylonia — Laskowice Pomorskie
- Regional services (R) Gdynia Chylonia — Bydgoszcz Główna
- Regional services (R) Słupsk — Bydgoszcz Główna
- Regional services (R) Kwidzyn — Tczew
- Regional services (R) Grudziądz — Tczew

== Preserved locomotive ==
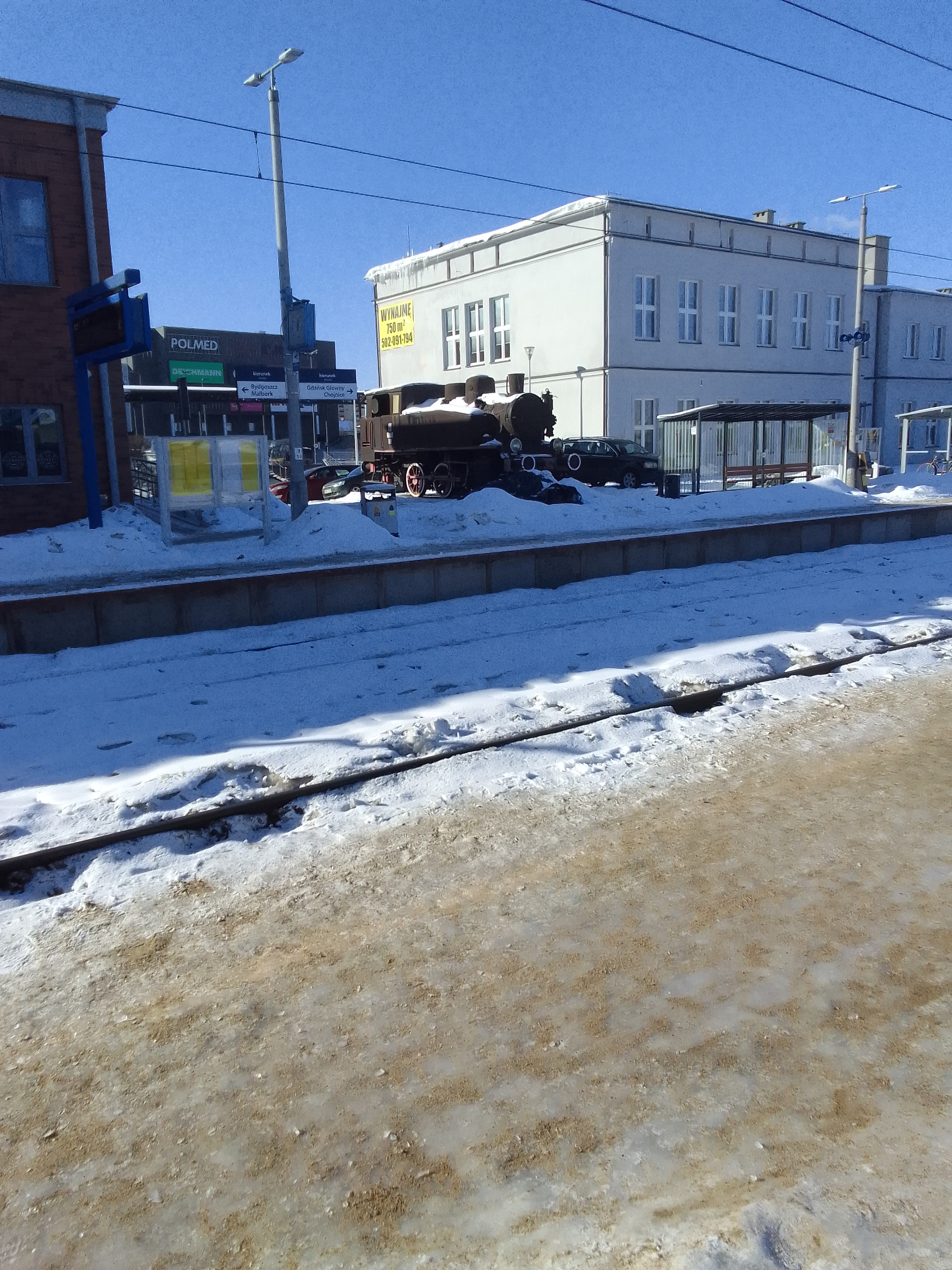
As of February 19, 2026,only two (2) trains are preserved, a Ferran 47 (pictured above) and a TKt48-170 (pictured below) nicknamed "Republika Locomotive" and "Lokomotywa Grzegorza Ciechowskiego" and coloured black and white for famous polish rock band Republika as lead singer, Grzegor Ciechowski was born in Tczew. These locomotives are located outside the station and free to see.

== Gallery ==
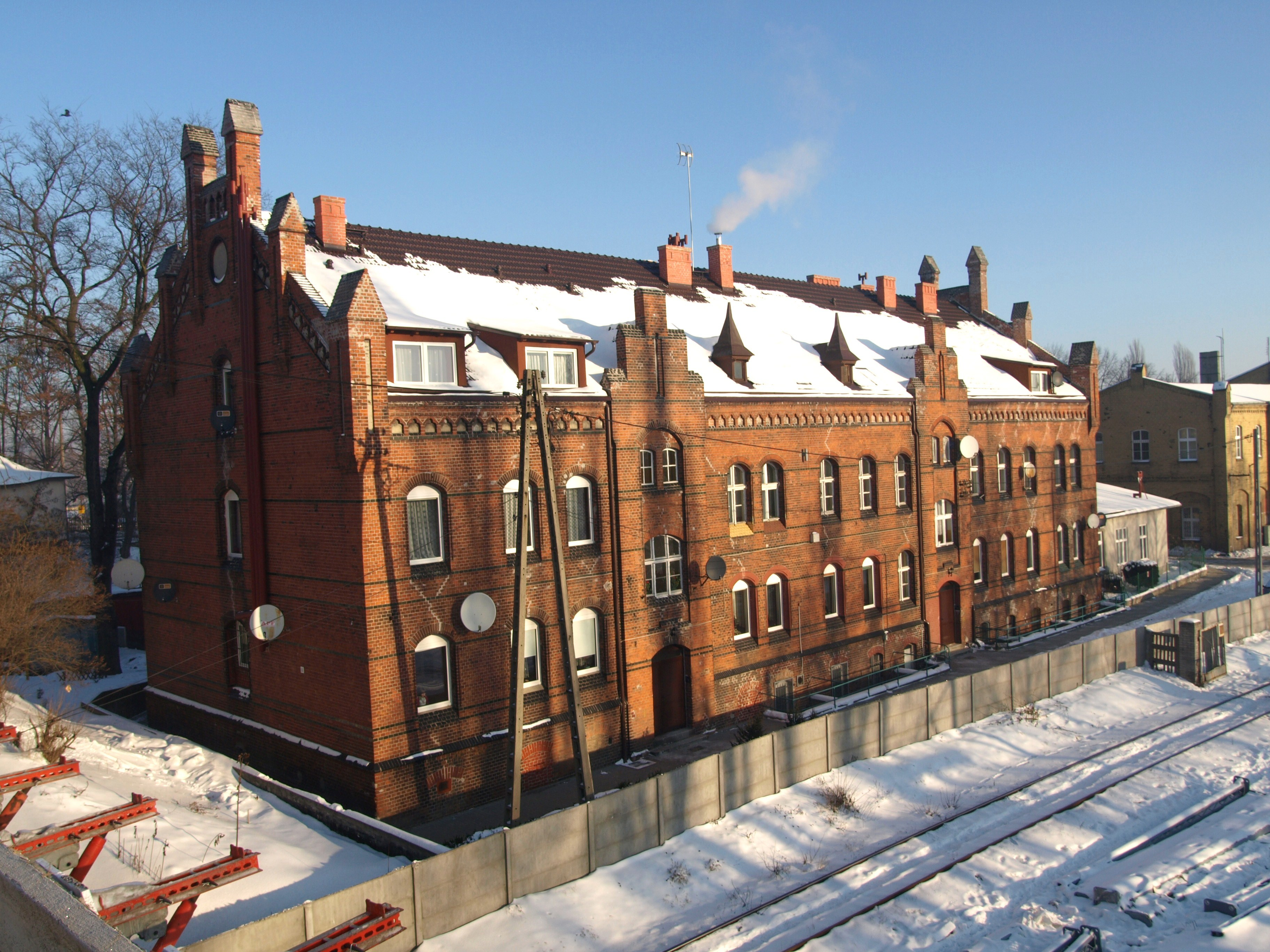
The station building

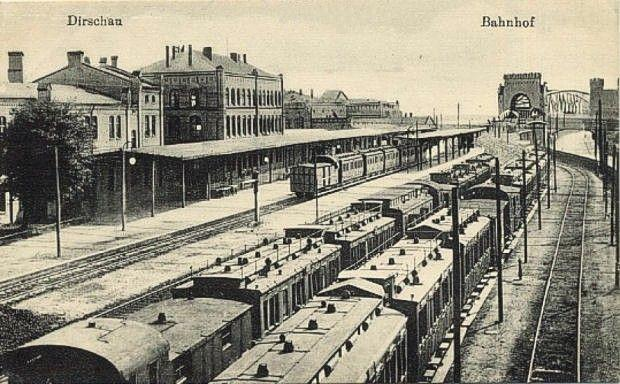
Tczew (Dirschau) station around 1900
