= Różyny railway station =

Railway station in Różyny, Poland

Coordinates: 54.2128°N 18.6608°E

Różyny
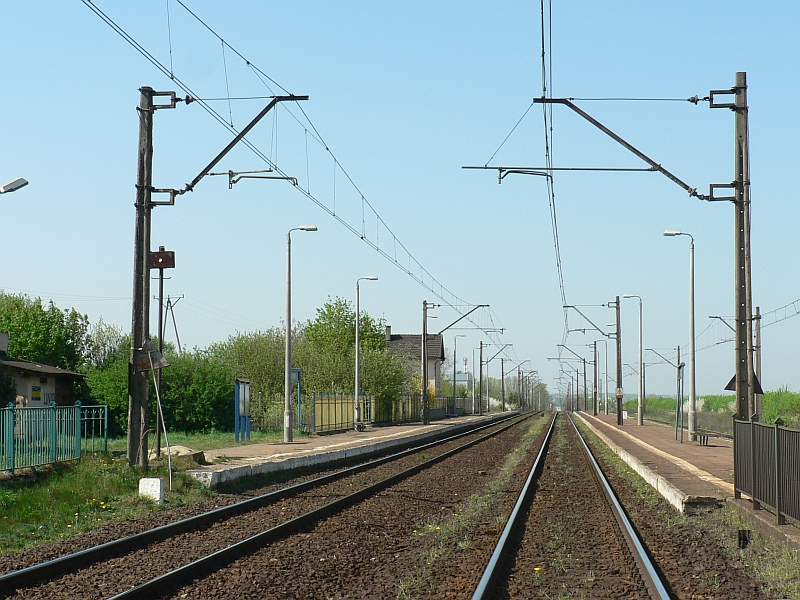
- Różyny railway station

General information
- Location: Różyny, Pomeranian Voivodeship; Poland
- System: Railway Station
- Operator: PKP Polskie Linie Kolejowe
- Line: 9: Warsaw–Gdańsk railway
- Platforms: 2
- Tracks: 3

History
- Rebuilt: 2010
Location
- Location within Poland

Różyny railway station is a railway station serving the village of Różyny, in the Pomeranian Voivodeship, Poland. The station is located on the Warsaw–Gdańsk railway and the train services are operated by Polregio.

The station used to be known as Kleschkau.

== Modernisation ==
The station was modernised in 2010, which included rebuilding the platforms, renewing the tracks and the signalling system.

== Train services ==
The station is served by the following services:

- Regional services (R) Gdynia - Sopot - Gdansk - Tczew - Malbork - Elblag - Ilawa - Olsztyn
- Regional services (R) Gdynia - Sopot - Gdansk - Tczew - Laskowice - Bydgoszcz

| Preceding station | Polregio | Following station |
|---|---|---|
| Pruszcz Gdański towards Gdynia Chylonia | PR | Skowarcz towards Olsztyn Główny |
| Pruszcz Gdański towards Gdynia Chylonia | PR | Skowarcz towards Bydgoszcz Główna |
