= Miłobądz railway station =

Railway station in Miłobądz Mały, Poland

Miłobądz
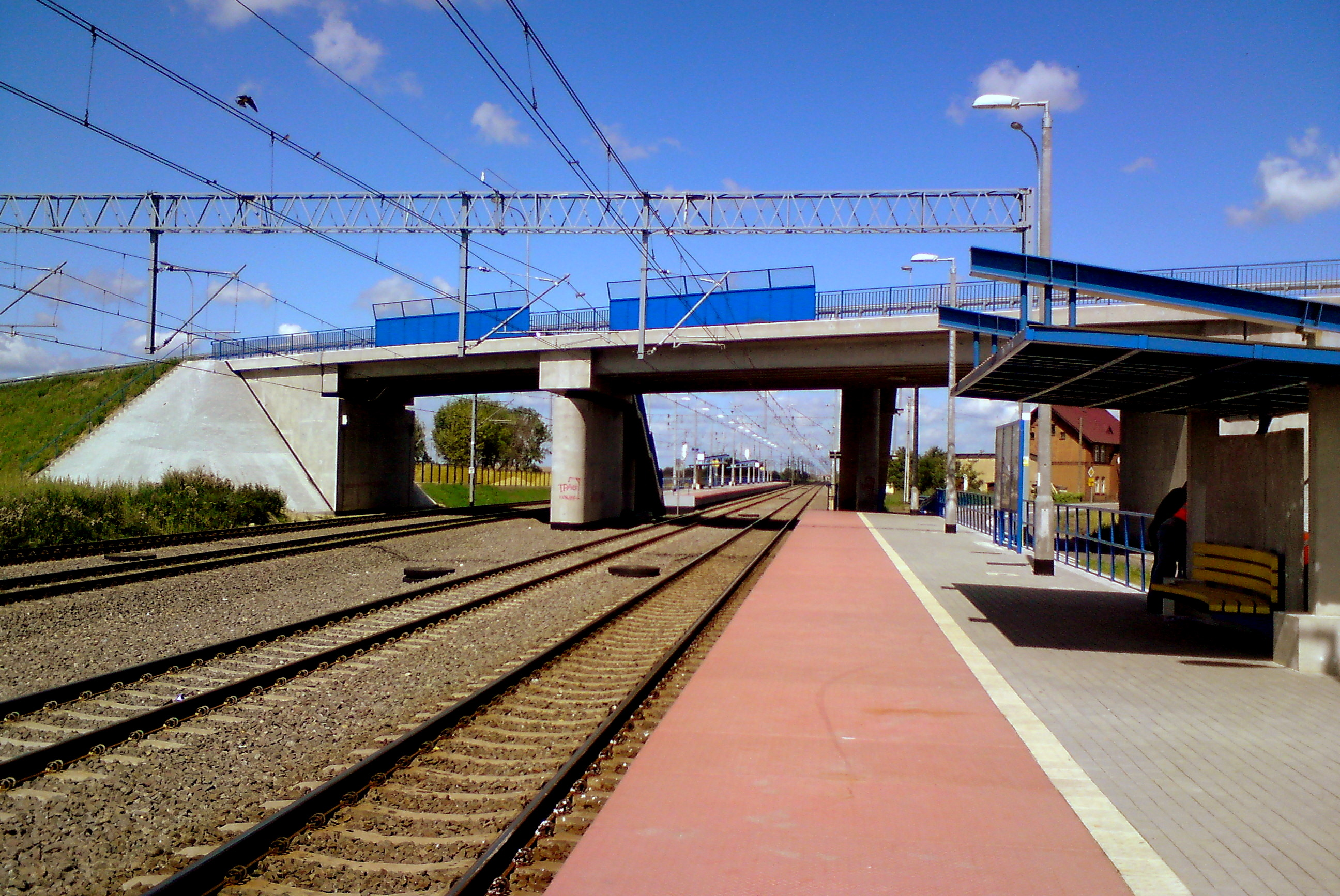
- Miłobądz railway station

General information
- Location: Miłobądz Mały, Pomeranian Voivodeship; Poland
- System: Railway Station
- Operator: PKP Polskie Linie Kolejowe
- Line: 9: Warsaw–Gdańsk railway
- Platforms: 3
- Tracks: 4

History
- Rebuilt: 2010
Location
- Location within Poland

Miłobądz railway station is a railway station serving the village of Miłobądz Mały in the Pomeranian Voivodeship, Poland. The station is located on the Warsaw–Gdańsk railway. The train services are operated by Polregio.

The station used to be known as Mühblanz.

A train crash took place here on 6 July 1972.

== Modernisation ==
The station was modernised in 2010, which included rebuilding the platforms, renewing the tracks and the signalling system.

== Train services ==
The station is served by the following services:

- Regional services (R) Gdynia - Sopot - Gdansk - Tczew - Malbork - Elblag - Ilawa - Olsztyn
- Regional services (R) Gdynia - Sopot - Gdansk - Tczew - Laskowice - Bydgoszcz

Preceding station	Polregio	Following station
Pszczółki towards Gdynia Chylonia	PR	Tczew towards Olsztyn Główny
Pszczółki towards Gdynia Chylonia	PR	Tczew towards Bydgoszcz Główna
