= Gdańsk Lipce railway station =

Railway station in Gdańsk, Poland

Gdańsk Lipce
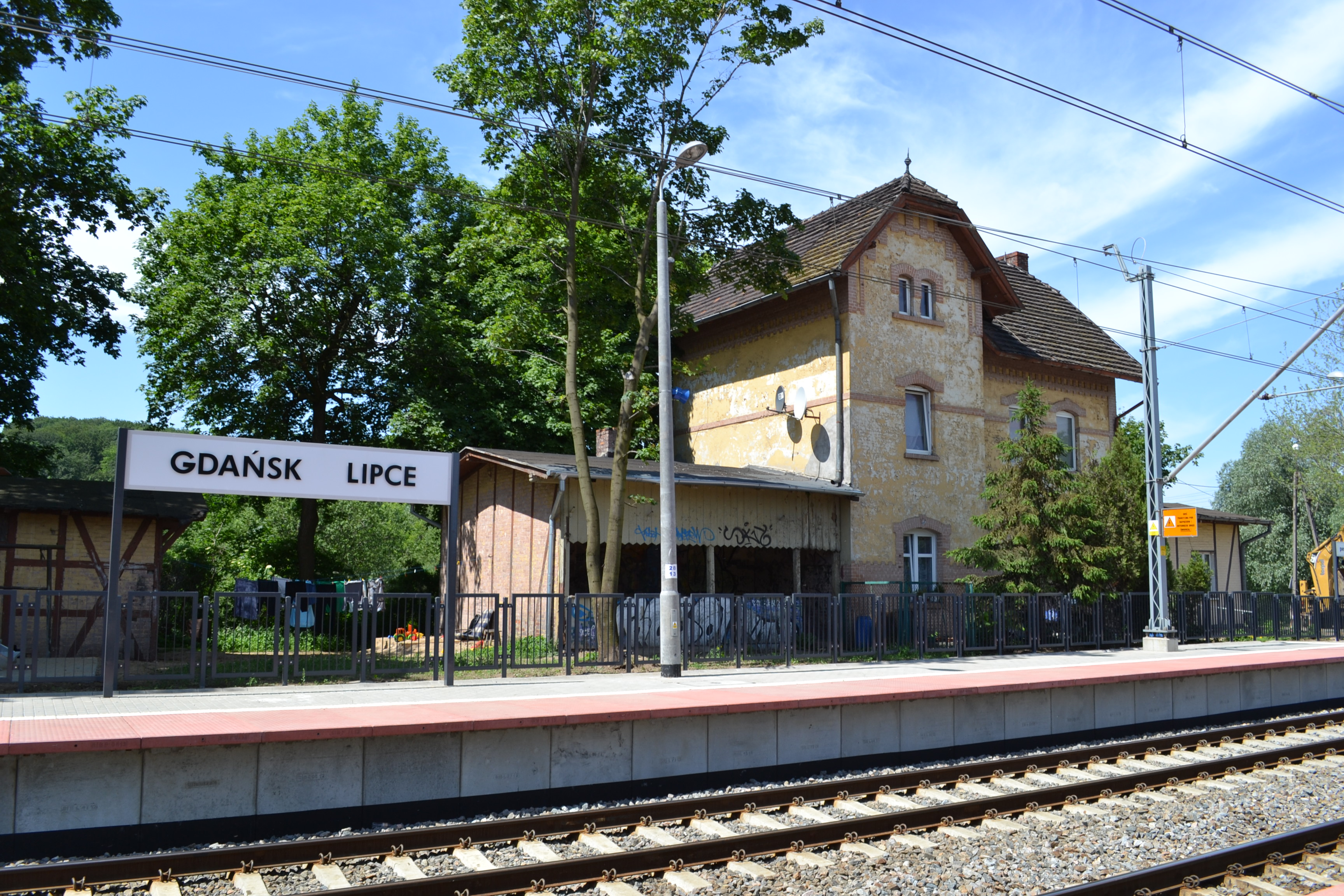
- Gdańsk Lipce railway station

General information
- Location: Orunia-Św. Wojciech-Lipce, Gdańsk, Pomeranian Voivodeship; Poland
- Operator: Polregio
- Line: Warsaw–Gdańsk
- Platforms: 2
- Tracks: 2

History
- Rebuilt: 2012
Location
- Location within Poland Location within Pomeranian Voivodeship

Gdańsk Lipce is a railway station serving the Orunia-Św. Wojciech-Lipce district of Gdańsk, in the Pomeranian Voivodeship, Poland. The station is located on the Warsaw–Gdańsk railway. Services are operated by Polregio.

Until 1945, the station was named Guteherberge.

== Modernisation ==
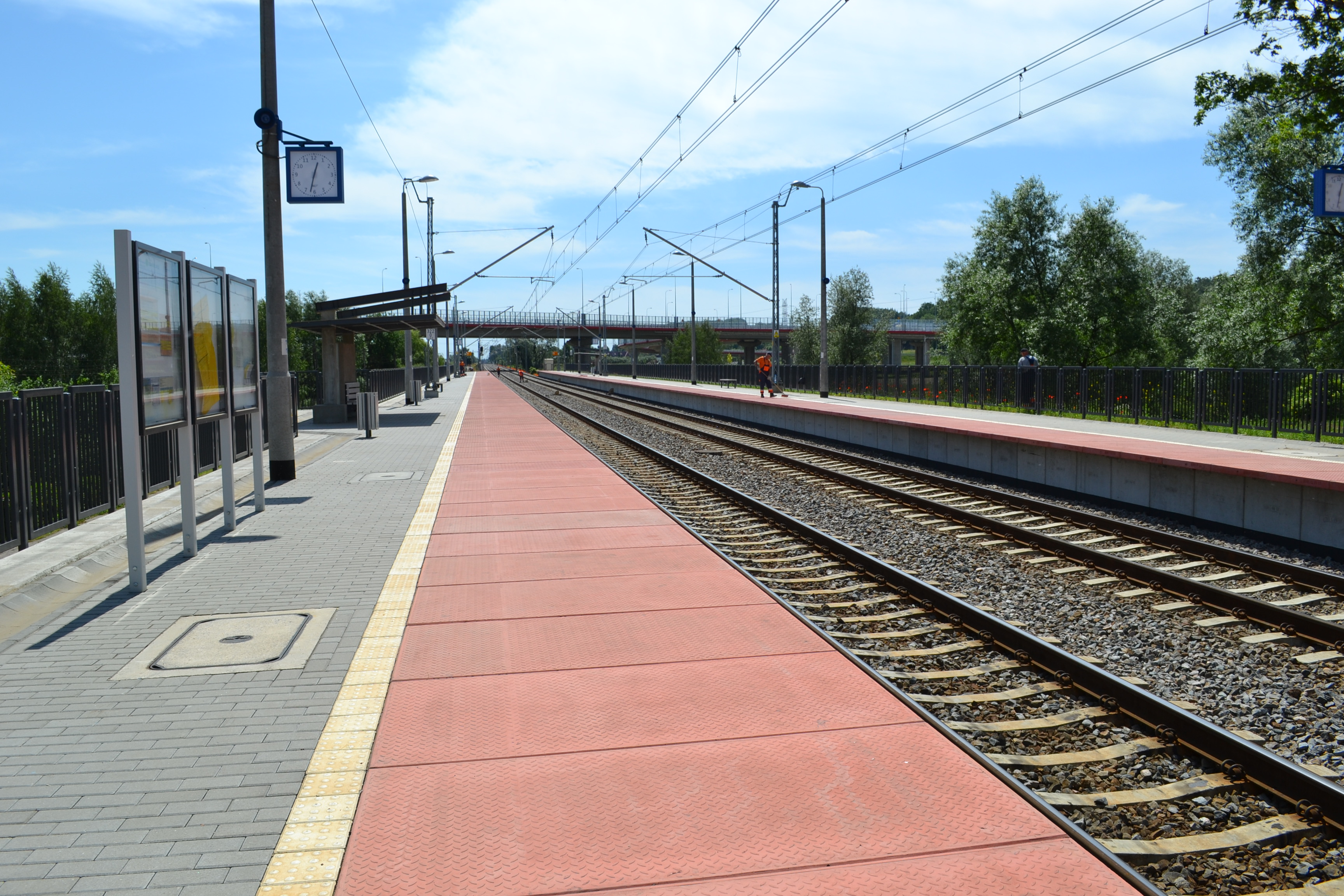
Platforms

The station was modernised in 2012 which included rebuilding the platforms.

== Train services ==
The station is served by the following services:

- Regional services (R) Gdynia - Sopot - Gdansk - Tczew - Malbork - Elblag - Iława - Olsztyn
- Regional services (R) Gdynia - Sopot - Gdansk - Tczew - Laskowice - Bydgoszcz

Preceding station	Polregio	Following station
Gdańsk Orunia towards Gdynia Chylonia	PR	Pruszcz Gdański towards Olsztyn Główny
Gdańsk Orunia towards Gdynia Chylonia	PR	Pruszcz Gdański towards Bydgoszcz Główna
