= Skowarcz railway station =

Railway station in Skowarcz, Poland

Coordinates: 54.1855°N 18.6821°E

Skowarcz
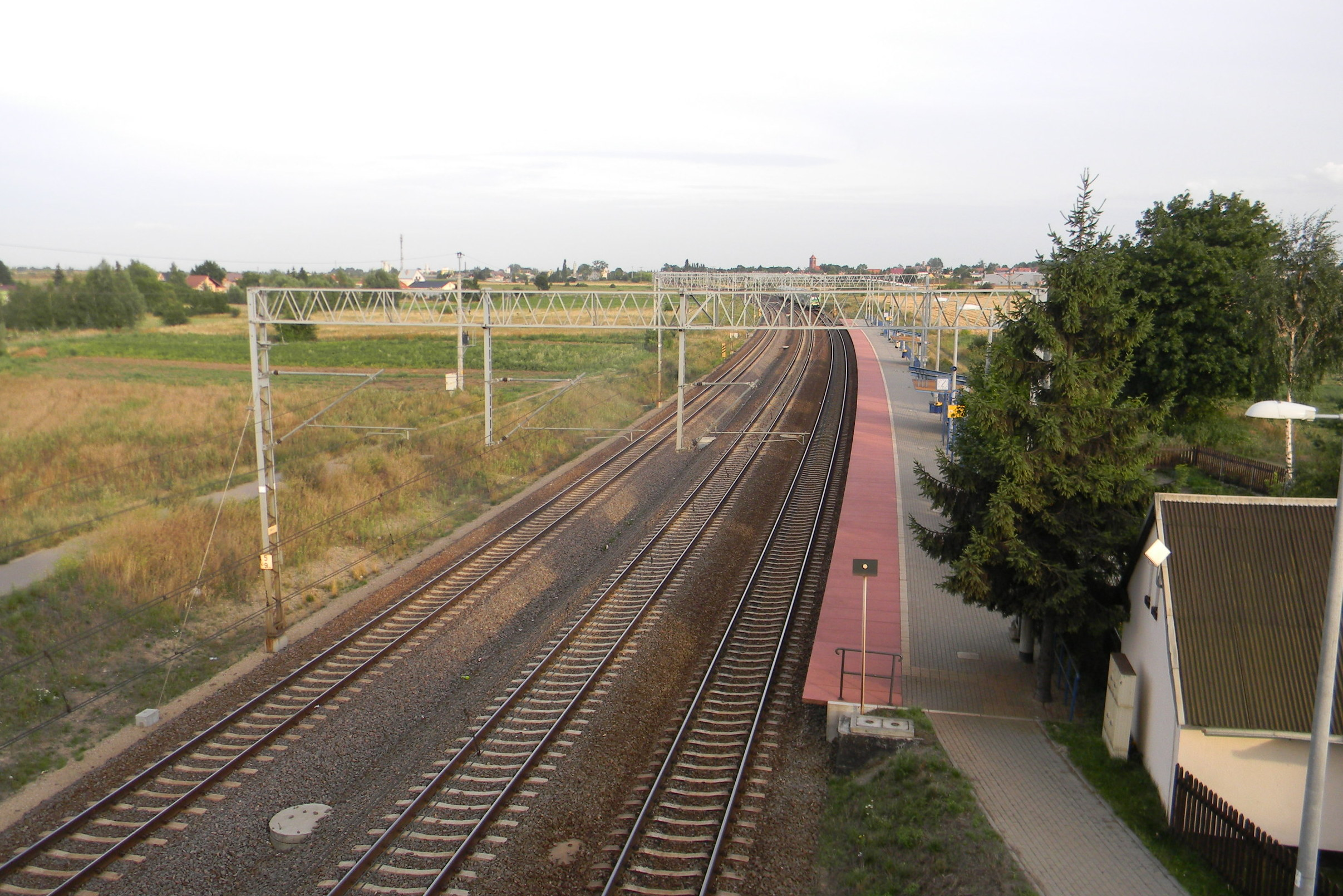
- Skowarcz railway station

General information
- Location: Skowarcz, Pomeranian Voivodeship; Poland
- System: Railway Station
- Operator: PKP Polskie Linie Kolejowe
- Line: 9: Warsaw–Gdańsk railway
- Platforms: 2
- Tracks: 3

History
- Rebuilt: 2010
Location
- Location within Poland

Skowarcz railway station is a railway station serving the village of Skowarcz, in the Pomeranian Voivodeship, Poland. The station is located on the Warsaw–Gdańsk railway and the train services are operated by Polregio.

The station used to be known as Schönwarling.

== Modernisation ==
The station was modernised in 2010, which included rebuilding the platforms, renewing the tracks and the signalling system.

== Train services ==
The station is served by the following services:

- Regional services (R) Gdynia – Sopot – Gdansk – Tczew – Malbork – Elblag – Ilawa – Olsztyn
- Regional services (R) Gdynia – Sopot – Gdansk – Tczew – Laskowice – Bydgoszcz

| Preceding station | Polregio | Following station |
|---|---|---|
| Różyny towards Gdynia Chylonia | PR | Pszczółki towards Olsztyn Główny |
| Różyny towards Gdynia Chylonia | PR | Pszczółki towards Bydgoszcz Główna |
