= Gdańsk Orunia railway station =

Railway station in Gdańsk, Poland

Gdańsk Orunia
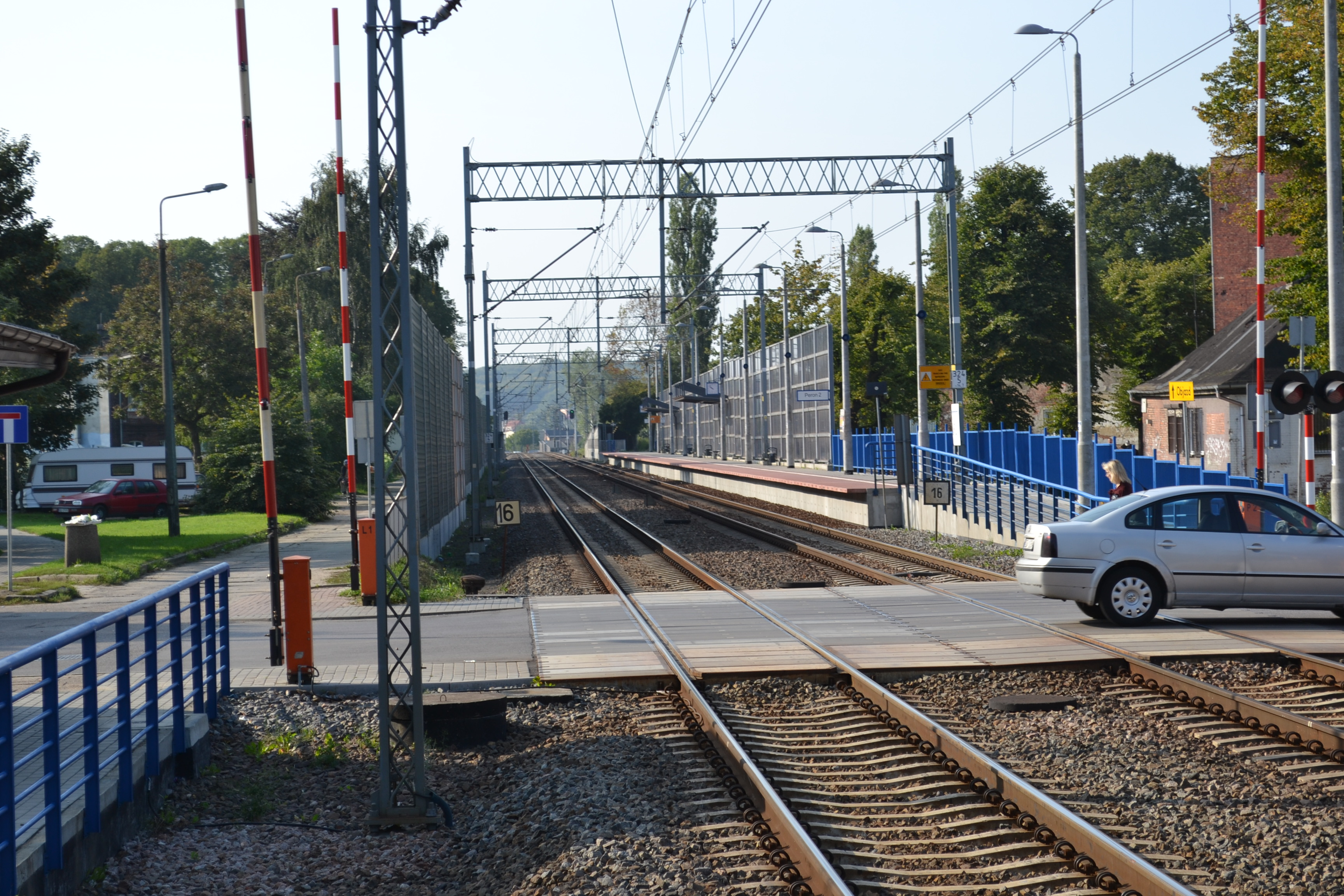
- Gdańsk Orunia railway station

General information
- Location: Gdańsk, Pomeranian Voivodeship; Poland
- System: Railway Station
- Operator: Polregio
- Line: 9: Warsaw–Gdańsk railway
- Platforms: 2
- Tracks: 2

History
- Opened: 6 August 1852; 174 years ago
- Rebuilt: 2012

Passengers
- 2022: 700-999
Location
- Location within Poland

Gdańsk Orunia railway station is a railway station serving the city of Gdańsk, in the Pomeranian Voivodeship, Poland. The station opened in 1852 and is located on the Warsaw–Gdańsk railway. The train services are operated by Polregio.

The station used to be known as Danzig Ohra.

== Modernisation ==
The station was modernised in 2012 which included rebuilding the platforms and building sound barriers.

== Train services ==
The station is served by the following services:

- Regional services (R) Gdynia - Sopot - Gdansk - Tczew - Malbork - Elblag - Ilawa - Olsztyn
- Regional services (R) Gdynia - Sopot - Gdansk - Tczew - Laskowice - Bydgoszcz

| Preceding station | Polregio | Following station |
|---|---|---|
| Gdańsk Główny towards Gdynia Chylonia | PR | Gdańsk Lipce towards Olsztyn Główny |
| Gdańsk Główny towards Gdynia Chylonia | PR | Gdańsk Lipce towards Bydgoszcz Główna |
