= Pszczółki railway station =

Railway station in the Pomeranian Voivodeship, Poland

Pszczółki
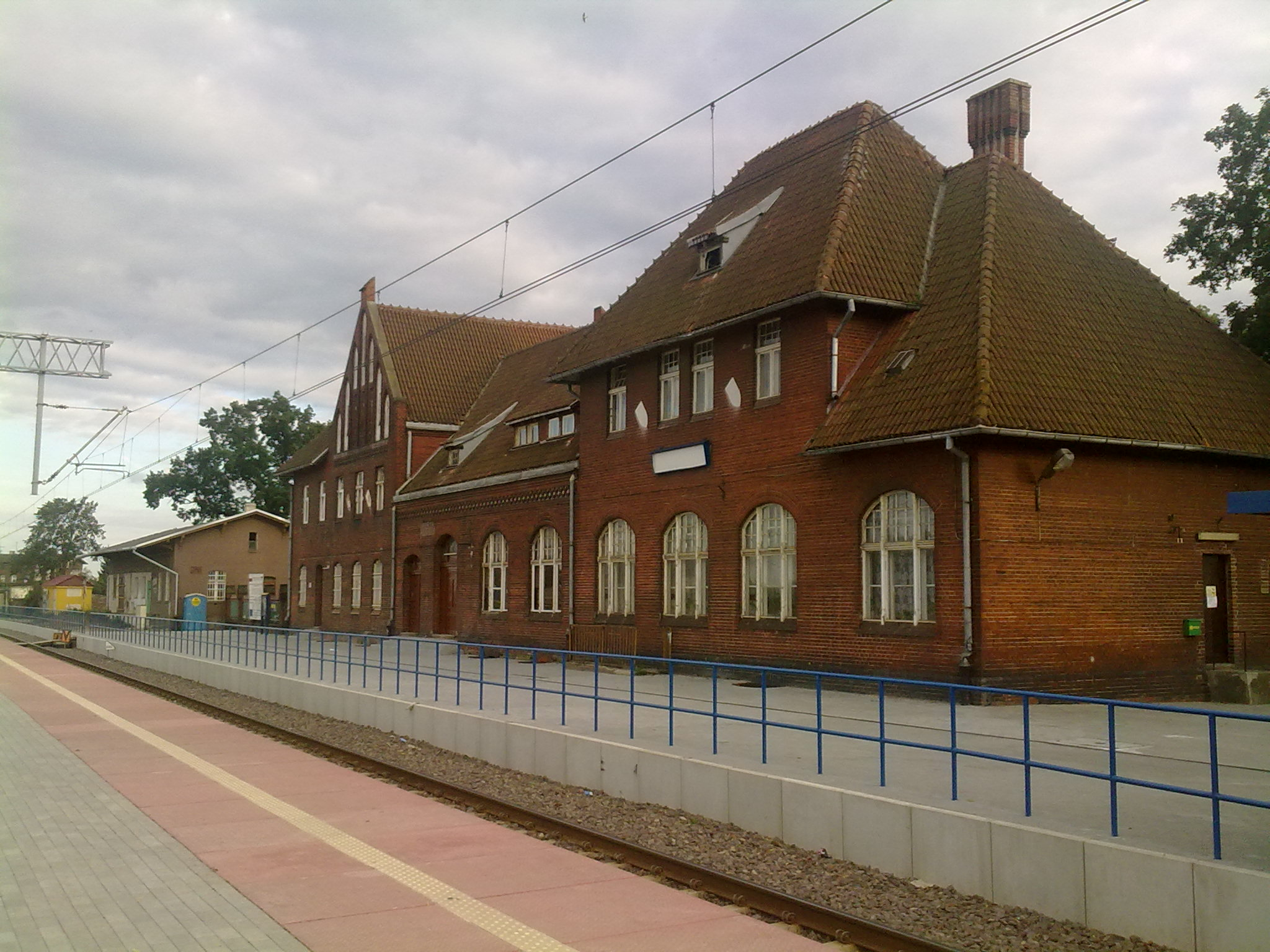
- Pszczółki railway station

General information
- Location: Pszczółki, Pomeranian Voivodeship; Poland
- System: Railway Station
- Operator: PKP Polskie Linie Kolejowe
- Line: 9: Warsaw–Gdańsk railway
- Platforms: 4
- Tracks: 7

History
- Opened: 6 August 1852; 174 years ago
- Rebuilt: 2010
Location
- Location within Poland

Pszczółki railway station is a railway station serving the town of Pszczółki, Gmina Pszczółki, in the Pomeranian Voivodeship, Poland. The station opened in 1852 and is located on the Warsaw–Gdańsk railway. The train services are operated by Polregio.

This station used to be known as Hohenstein (Westpreußen).

== Modernisation ==
The station was modernised in 2010, which included rebuilding the platforms, renewing the tracks and the signalling system.

== Train services ==
The station is served by the following services:

- Regional services (R) Gdynia - Sopot - Gdansk - Tczew - Malbork - Elblag - Ilawa - Olsztyn
- Regional services (R) Gdynia - Sopot - Gdansk - Tczew - Laskowice - Bydgoszcz

Preceding station	Polregio	Following station
Skowarcz towards Gdynia Chylonia	PR	Miłobądz towards Olsztyn Główny
Skowarcz towards Gdynia Chylonia	PR	Miłobądz towards Bydgoszcz Główna

== Gallery ==
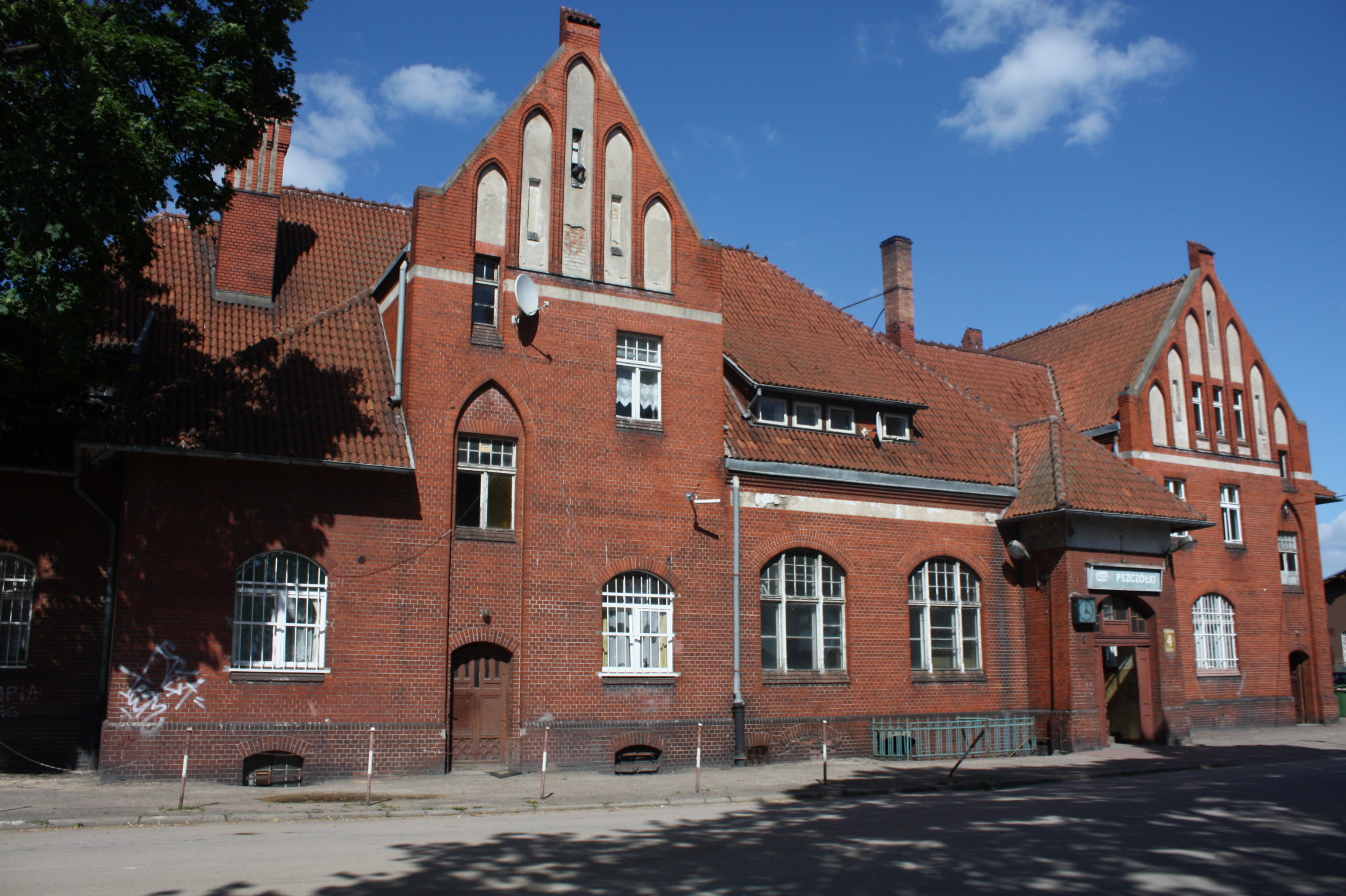
The station building

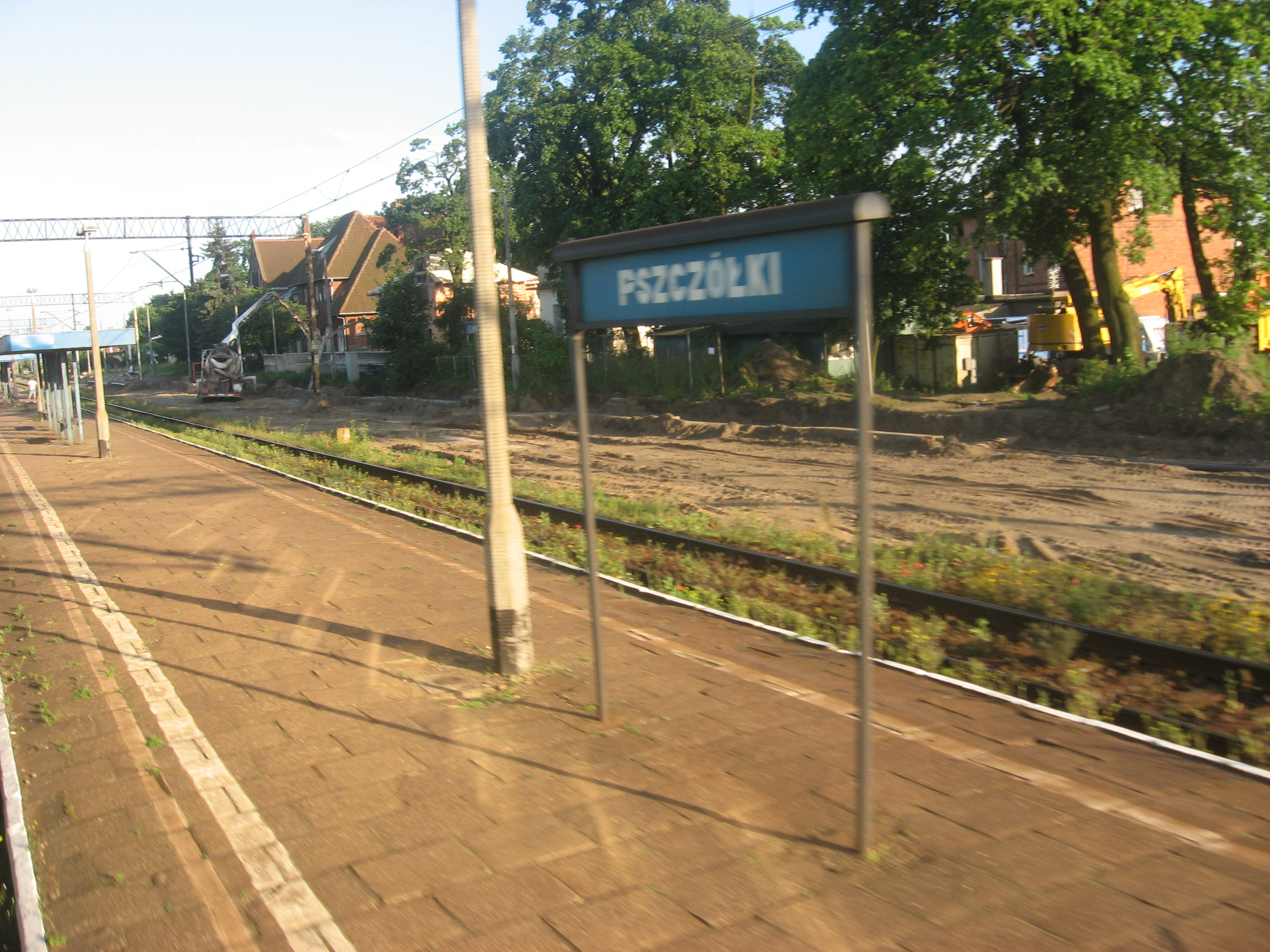
The station before modernisation

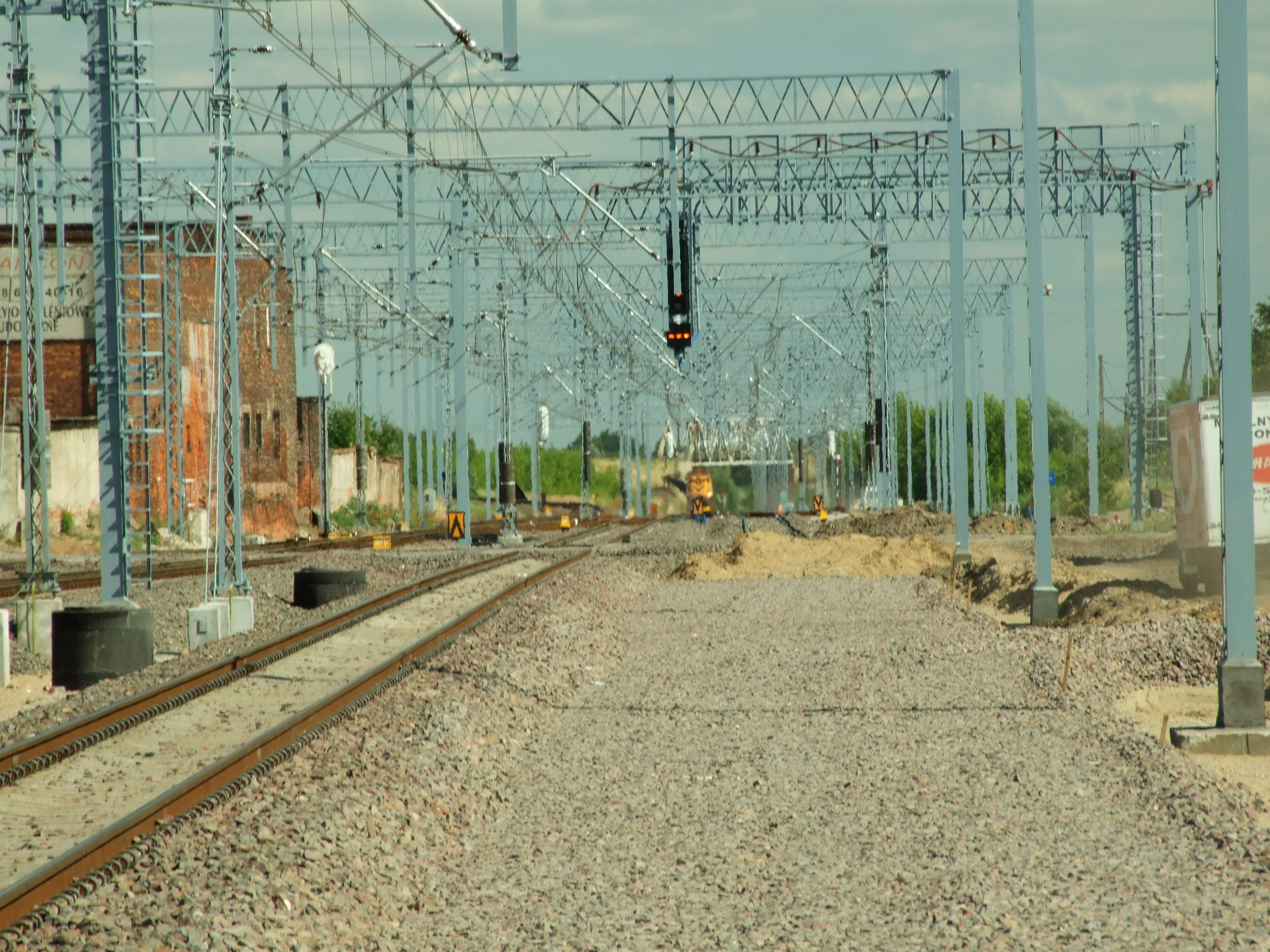
Modernisation of the railway through the station in 2010

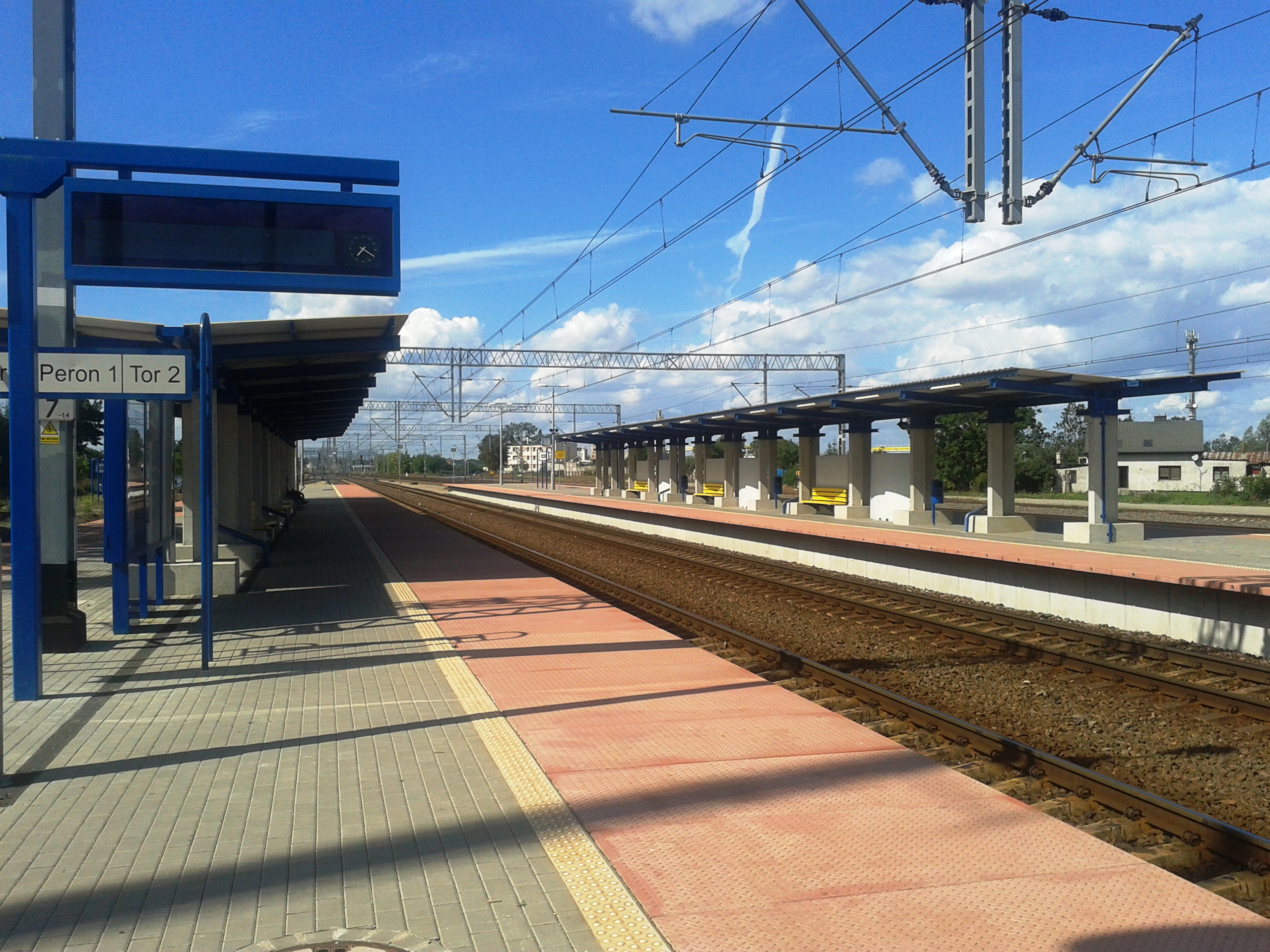
The station after modernisation
