= Pruszcz Gdański railway station =

Railway station in Pruszcz Gdański, Poland

Coordinates: 54.2581°N 18.6469°E

Pruszcz Gdański
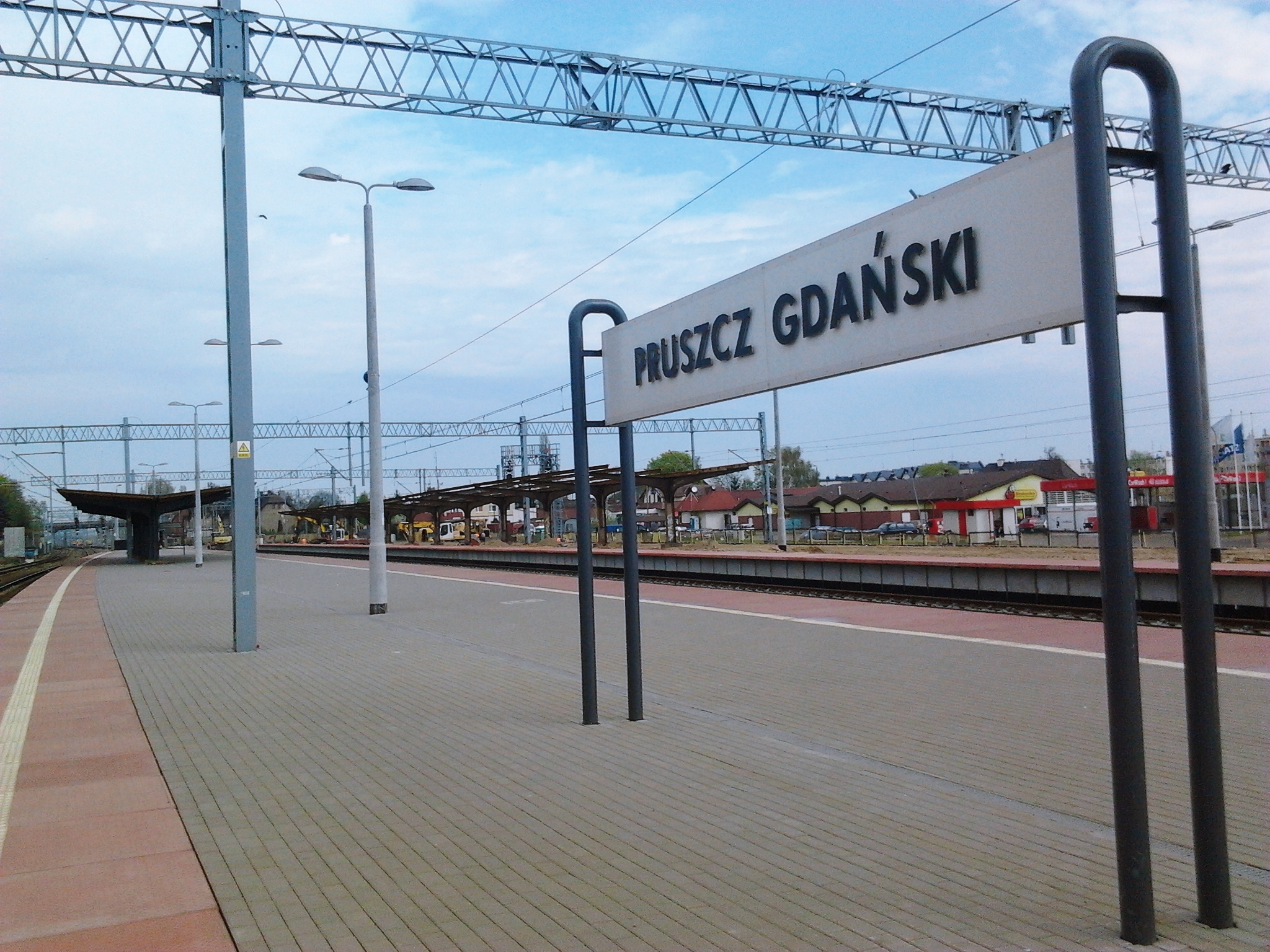
- Pruszcz Gdański railway station during modernisation in 2013

General information
- Location: Pruszcz Gdański, Pomeranian Voivodeship; Poland
- System: Railway Station
- Operator: PKP Polskie Linie Kolejowe
- Lines: 9: Warsaw–Gdańsk railway 226: Pruszcz Gdański–Gdańsk Port Północny railway 229: Pruszcz Gdański–Łeba railway
- Platforms: 4
- Tracks: 7

History
- Opened: 6 August 1852; 174 years ago
- Rebuilt: 2012-2014
Location
- Location within Poland

Pruszcz Gdański railway station is a railway station serving the town of Pruszcz Gdański, in the Pomeranian Voivodeship, Poland. The station opened in 1852 and is located on the Warsaw–Gdańsk railway, Pruszcz Gdański–Gdańsk Port Północny railway and Pruszcz Gdański–Łeba railway. The train services are operated by Polregio.

The station used to be known as Praust.

== Modernisation ==
The station was modernised between 2012 and 2014 which included rebuilding the platforms, renewing the tracks and the signalling system.

== Train services ==
The station is served by the following services:

- Regional services (R) Gdynia - Sopot - Gdansk - Tczew - Malbork - Elblag - Ilawa - Olsztyn
- Regional services (R) Gdynia - Sopot - Gdansk - Tczew - Laskowice - Bydgoszcz

Preceding station	Polregio	Following station
Gdańsk Lipce towards Gdynia Chylonia	PR	Różyny towards Olsztyn Główny
Gdańsk Lipce towards Gdynia Chylonia	PR	Różyny towards Bydgoszcz Główna
