= Iława Główna railway station =

Railway station in Warmian–Masuria, Poland

Iława Główna
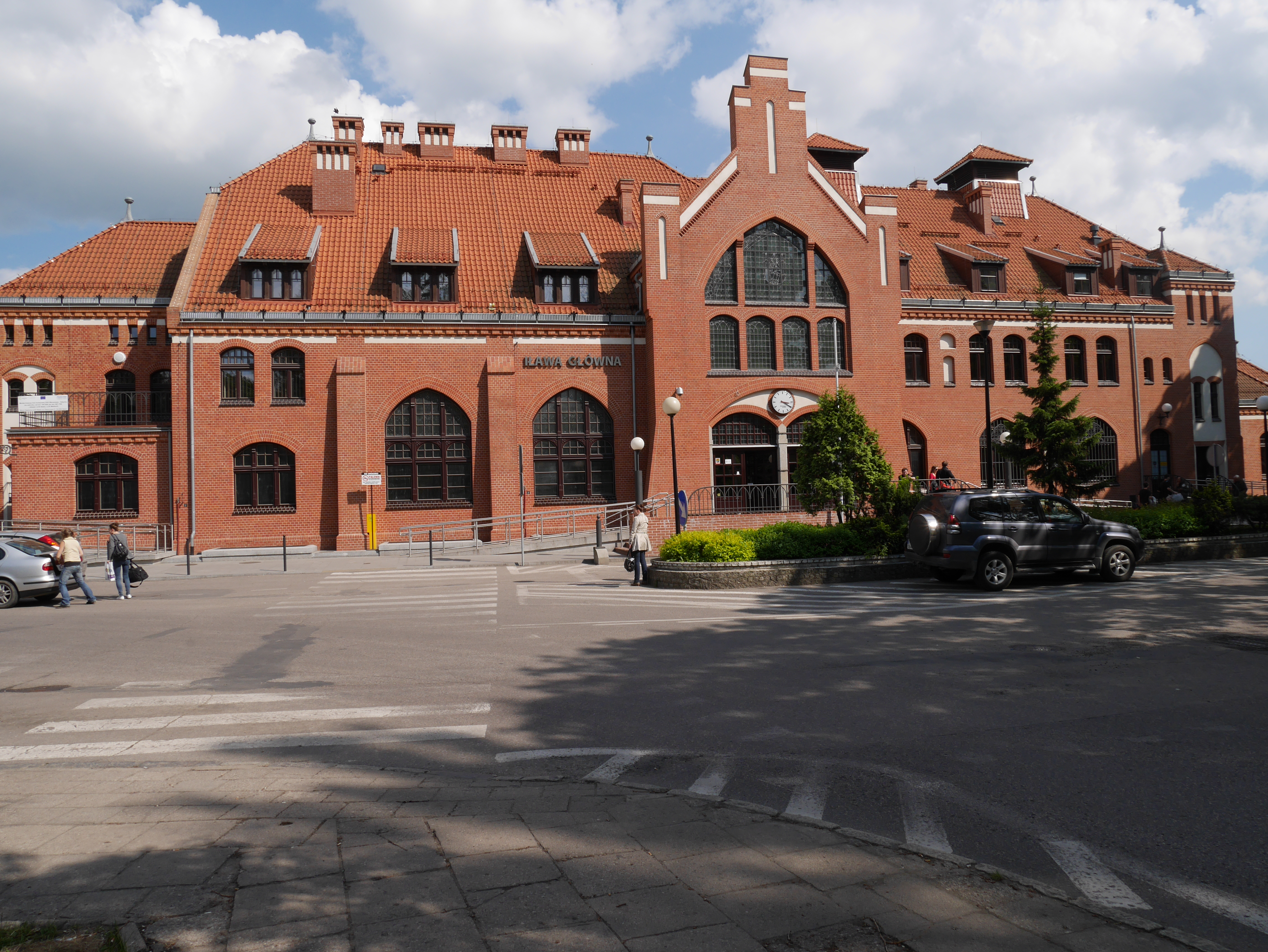

General information
- Location: Iława, Warmian–Masurian Voivodeship; Poland
- Coordinates: 53°34′57″N 19°34′24″E
- System: A
- Owner: Polskie Koleje Państwowe S.A.
- Platforms: 3

History
- Opened: 1872

Services
Preceding station	PKP Intercity	Following station
Malbork towards Gdynia Główna	EIP	Warszawa Wschodnia towards Warszawa Centralna
Malbork towards Gdynia Główna	EIP	Warszawa Wschodnia towards Gliwice or Bielsko-Biała Główna
Malbork towards Gdynia Główna or Kołobrzeg	EIP	Warszawa Wschodnia towards Kraków Główny or Rzeszów Główny
Prabutyi towards Kołobrzeg	IC	Działdowo towards Łódź Fabryczna
Prabuty towards Szczecin Główny	IC	Ostróda towards Olsztyn Główny
Susz towards Gdynia Główna	TLK	Działdowo towards Zakopane
Prabuty towards Kołobrzeg	TLK	Działdowo towards Kraków Główny
Preceding station	Polregio	Following station
Iława Miasto towards Malbork	PR	Terminus
Terminus	PR	Smolniki towards Działdowo
Jamielnik towards Jabłonowo Pomorskie or Toruń Główny	PR	Rudzienice Suskie towards Olsztyn Główny
Iława Miasto towards Gdynia Chylonia	PR	Samborowo towards Olsztyn Główny
Location

Iława Główna railway station is the main railway station in the town of Iława, Poland. The station is connected to various cities in Poland via PKP Express Intercity Premium (EIP), Intercity (IC), and Twoje Linie Kolejowe (TLK) services, and various regional cities via Polregio service.

== History ==
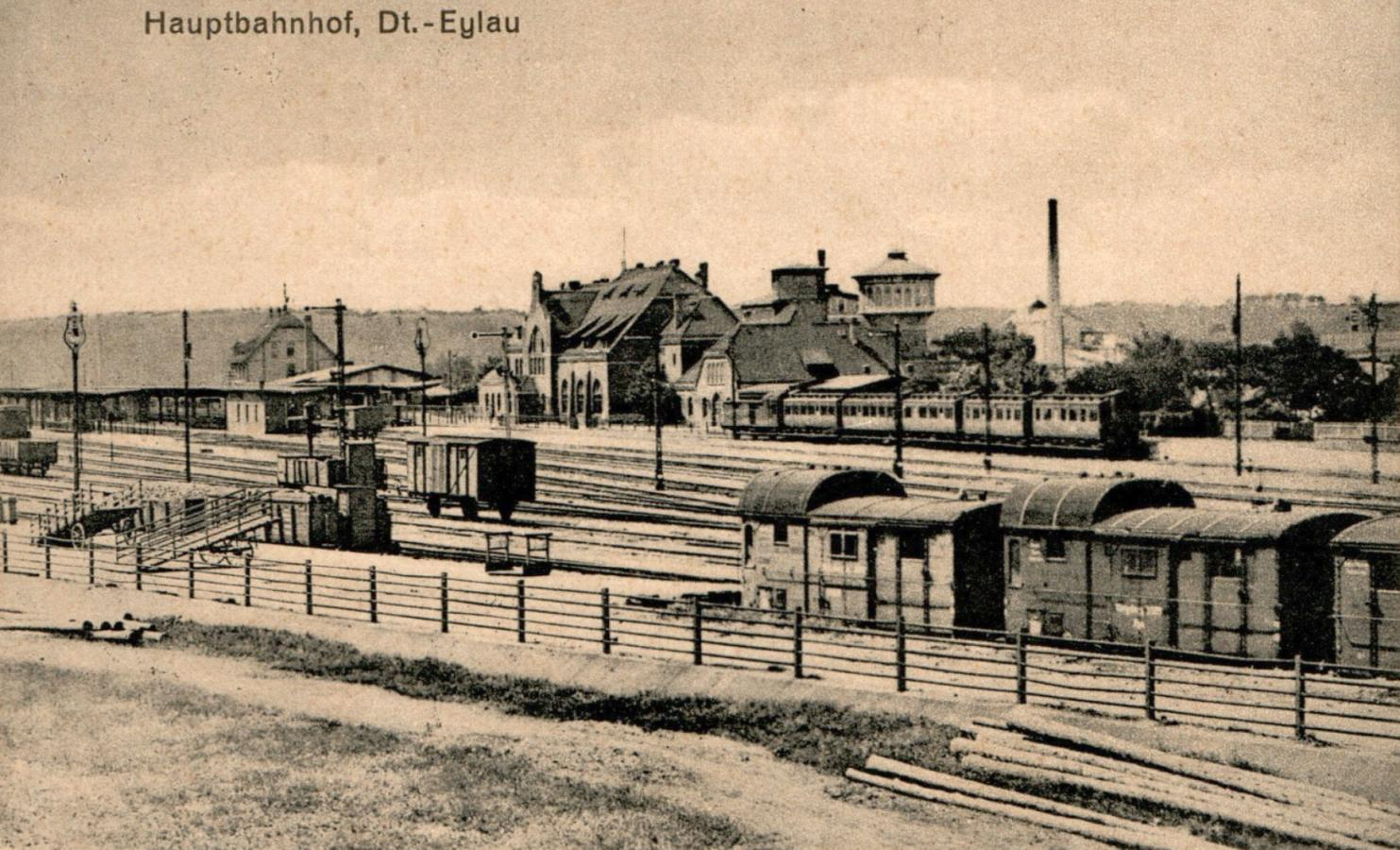
Station 1910

The station opened on October 2, 1872, when the town was under German rule. It served as a border station on the German side between Poland and Germany in the interwar period, and following Germany's defeat in World War II it passed to Poland.

== Train services ==
The station is served by the following service(s):

- Express Intercity Premium services (EIP) Gdynia - Warsaw
- Express Intercity Premium services (EIP) Gdynia - Warsaw - Katowice - Gliwice/Bielsko-Biała
- Express Intercity Premium services (EIP) Gdynia/Kołobrzeg - Warsaw - Kraków (- Rzeszów)
- Intercity services (IC) Łódź Fabryczna — Warszawa — Gdańsk Glowny — Kołobrzeg
- Intercity services (IC) Szczecin - Koszalin - Słupsk - Lebork - Gdynia - Gdańsk - Malbork - Iława - Olsztyn
- Intercity services (TLK) Gdynia Główna — Zakopane
- Intercity services (TLK) Kołobrzeg — Gdynia Główna — Warszawa Wschodnia — Kraków Główny
- Regional services (R) Malbork — Iława Główna
- Regional services (R) Iława Główna — Działdowo
- Regional services (R) Jabłonowo Pomorskie — Olsztyn Główny
- Regional services (R) Toruń Główny — Olsztyn Główny
- Regional services (R) Gdynia Chylonia — Olsztyn Główny

== See also ==
- Rail transport in Poland
