= Malbork railway station =

Railway station in Pomerania, Poland

Malbork
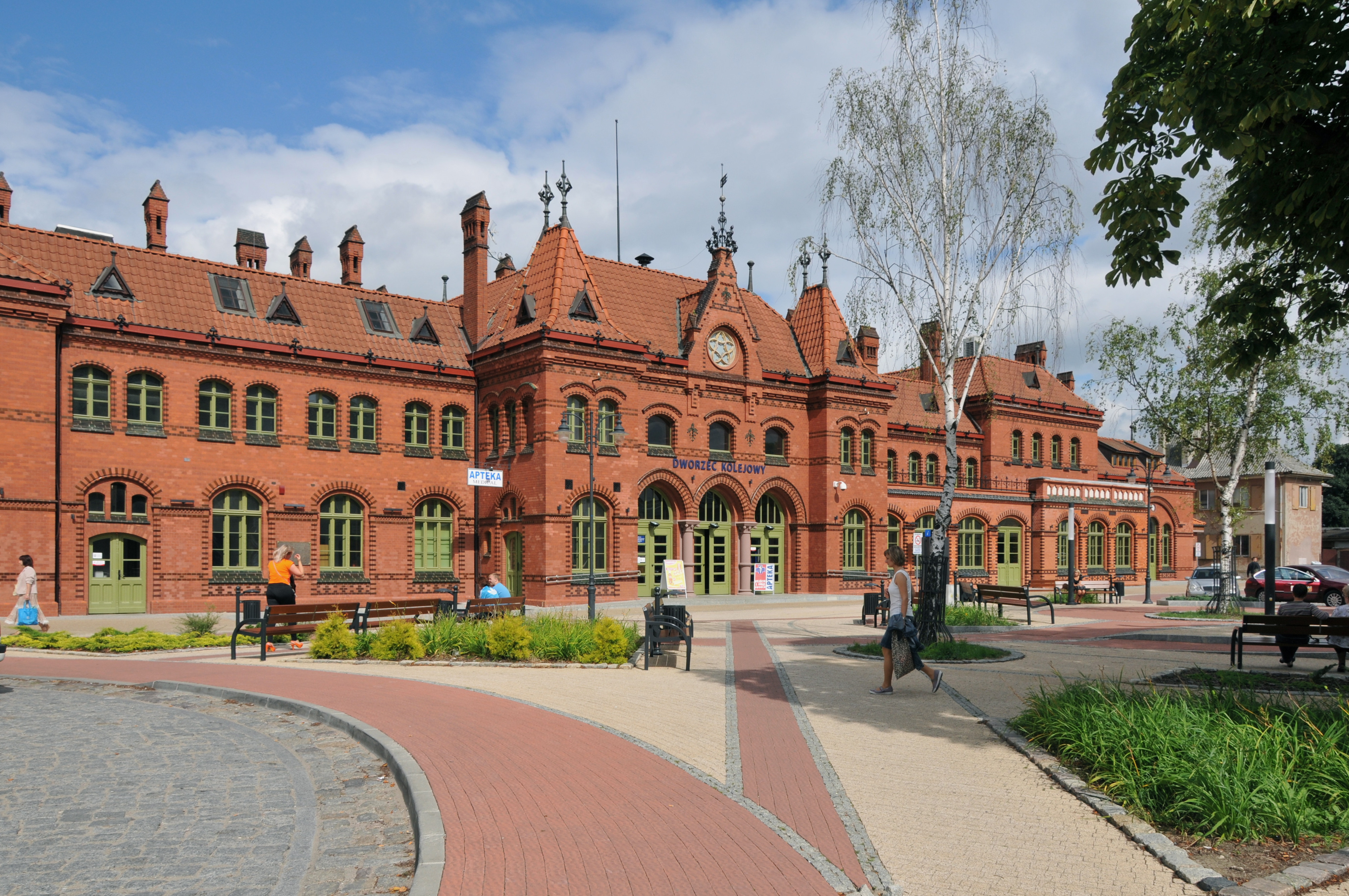

General information
- Location: Malbork, Pomeranian Voivodeship; Poland
- Coordinates: 54°02′09″N 19°02′35″E
- System: A
- Owner: Polskie Koleje Państwowe S.A.
- Platforms: 4

History
- Opened: 1852

Services
Preceding station	PKP Intercity	Following station
Tczew towards Gdynia Główna	EIP	Iława Główna towards Warszawa Centralna
Tczew towards Gdynia Główna	EIP	Iława Główna towards Gliwice or Bielsko-Biała Główna
Tczew towards Gdynia Główna or Kołobrzeg	EIP	Iława Główna towards Kraków Główny or Rzeszów Główny
Tczew towards Kołobrzeg	IC	Prabuty towards Łódź Fabryczna
Tczew towards Szczecin Główny	IC (via Iława Główna)	Prabuty towards Olsztyn Główny
Tczew towards Szczecin Główny	IC (via Elbląg)	Elbląg towards Olsztyn Główny
Tczew towards Szczecin Główny	IC	Elbląg towards Białystok
Tczew towards Gdynia Główna	TLK	Prabuty towards Zakopane
Tczew towards Kołobrzeg	TLK	Prabuty towards Kraków Główny
Preceding station	Polregio	Following station
Terminus	PR	Gronajny towards Iława Główna
Malbork Kałdowo towards Gdynia Główna, Gdynia Chylonia or Słupsk	PR	Terminus
Szymankowo towards Gdynia Chylonia	PR	Mikołajki Pomorskie towards Olsztyn Główny
Malbork Kałdowo towards Gdynia Główna, Gdynia Chylonia or Słupsk	PR	Królewo Malborskie towards Elbląg
Szymankowo towards Tczew	PR	Gościszewo towards Grudziądz or Kwidzyn
Terminus	PR	Gościszewo towards Grudziądz or Kwidzyn
Location
- Location within Poland Location within Pomeranian Voivodeship

Malbork railway station is the main railway station of the town of Malbork, Poland. The station is connected to various cities in Poland via PKP Express Intercity Premium (EIP), Intercity (IC), and Twoje Linie Kolejowe (TLK) services, and various regional cities via Polregio service.

== History ==
The station opened on 1852, when the town was located in the Prussian Partition of Poland, since 1871 part of Germany. It served as a border station on the German side between Free City of Danzig and Germany in the interwar period, and it passed to Poland with the conclusion of World War II.

== Train services ==
The station is served by the following service(s):

- Express Intercity Premium services (EIP) Gdynia - Warsaw
- Express Intercity Premium services (EIP) Gdynia - Warsaw - Katowice - Gliwice/Bielsko-Biała
- Express Intercity Premium services (EIP) Gdynia/Kołobrzeg - Warsaw - Kraków (- Rzeszów)
- Intercity services (IC) Łódź Fabryczna — Warszawa — Gdańsk Glowny — Kołobrzeg
- Intercity services (IC) Szczecin - Koszalin - Słupsk - Gdynia - Gdańsk - Malbork - via Elbląg - Olsztyn
- Intercity services (IC) Szczecin - Koszalin - Słupsk - Gdynia - Gdańsk - Malbork - via Iława - Olsztyn
- Intercity services (IC) Szczecin - Koszalin - Słupsk - Gdynia - Gdańsk - Elbląg - Olsztyn - Białystok
- Intercity services (TLK) Gdynia Główna — Zakopane
- Intercity services (TLK) Kołobrzeg — Gdynia Główna — Warszawa Wschodnia — Kraków Główny
- Regional services (R) Iława Główna — Malbork
- Regional services (R) Malbork — Słupsk
- Regional services (R) Malbork — Gdynia Chylonia
- Regional services (R) Gdynia Chylonia — Olsztyn Główny
- Regional services (R) Elbląg — Gdynia Chylonia
- Regional services (R) Grudziądz — Tczew
- Regional services (R) Grudziądz — Malbork
- Regional services (R) Kwidzyn — Tczew
- Regional services (R) Kwidzyn — Malbork

== See also ==
- Rail transport in Poland
