= Mały Miłobądz =

Village in Pomeranian Voivodeship, Poland

- Village
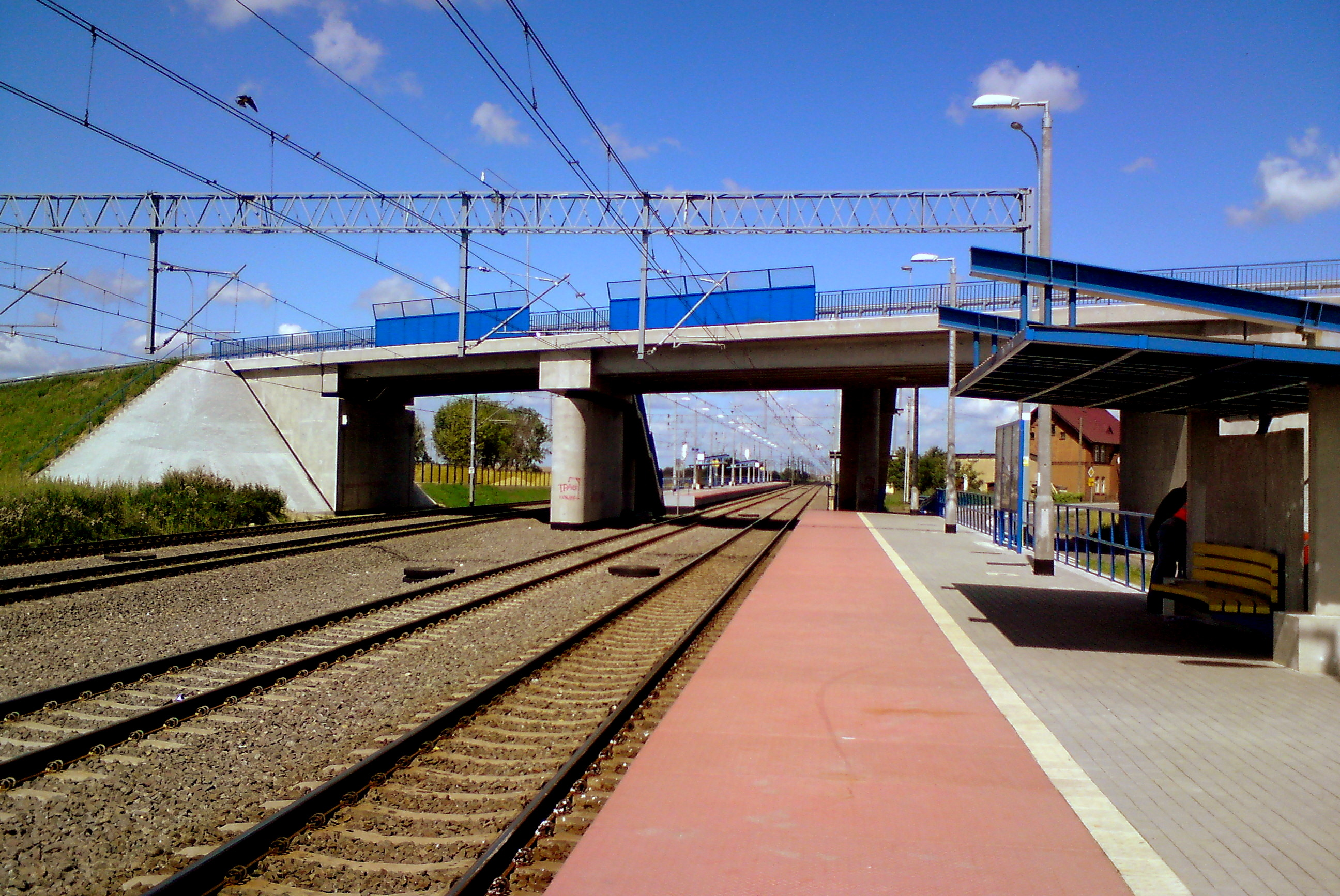
- View of Miłobądz railway station, which is located in the village

- Location within Poland
- Coordinates: 54°8′52″N 18°44′28″E
- Country: Poland
- Voivodeship: Pomeranian
- County: Tczew
- Gmina: Tczew

Population
  - Total: 139
- Time zone: UTC+1 (CET)
  - Summer (DST): UTC+2 (CEST)
- Vehicle registration: GTC

Mały Miłobądz [miˈwɔbɔnt͡s ˈmawɨ] is a village in the administrative district of Gmina Tczew, within Tczew County, Pomeranian Voivodeship, in northern Poland. It is located within the ethnocultural region of Kociewie in the historic region of Pomerania.
