= Różyny =

- Village
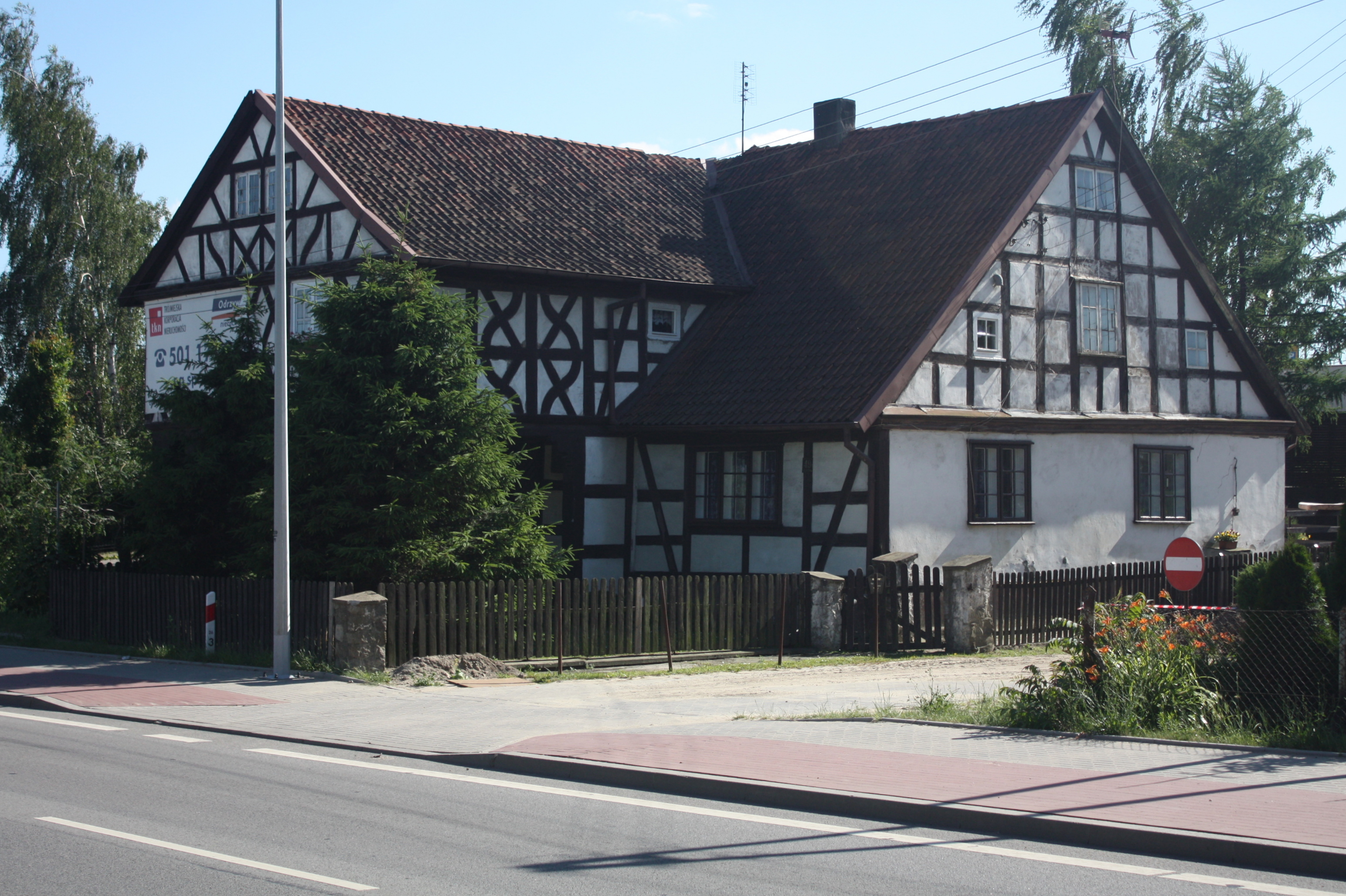
- Mennonite house in Różyny

- Location within Poland
- Coordinates: 54°12′13″N 18°39′53″E
- Country: Poland
- Voivodeship: Pomeranian
- County: Gdańsk
- Gmina: Pszczółki
- Population: 1,103 (2,011)
- Time zone: UTC+1 (CET)
  - Summer (DST): UTC+2 (CEST)
- Website: http://rozyny.pl

Różyny [ruˈʐɨnɨ] is a village in the administrative district of Gmina Pszczółki, within Gdańsk County, Pomeranian Voivodeship, in northern Poland. It is located within the historic region of Pomerania.

Różyny was a royal village of the Polish Crown, administratively located in the Tczew County in the Pomeranian Voivodeship.
