= Bydgoszcz Główna railway station =

Railway station in Bydgoszcz, Poland

Coordinates: 53°08′07″N 17°59′29″E

Bydgoszcz Główna
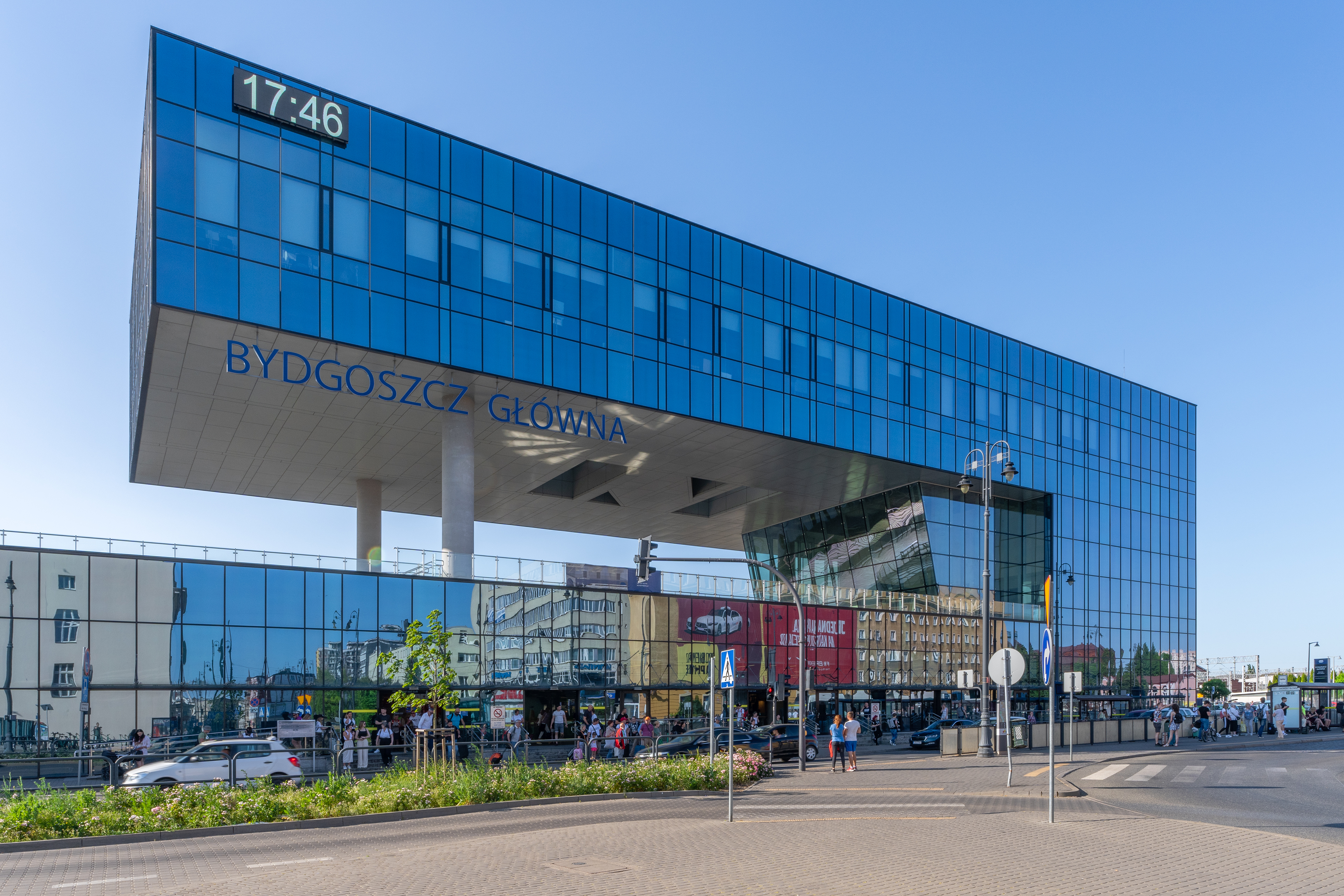

General information
- Location: Bydgoszcz, Kuyavian-Pomeranian Voivodeship; Poland
- System: A
- Owner: PKP Polskie Linie Kolejowe
- Platforms: 9

History
- Opened: 1851
- Former names: Bromberg Hauptbahnhof
Location

Bydgoszcz Główna (Polish for Bydgoszcz Main station, sometimes also translated as Bydgoszcz Central) is the principal railway station serving the city of Bydgoszcz, the largest city and co-capital of Poland's Kuyavian-Pomeranian Voivodeship.

== History ==
The first station building in Bydgoszcz was established in 1851 during construction of the Prussian Eastern Railway from Krzyż to Königsberg. On 25 July 1851 the station was inaugurated upon the event of the official opening of the railway east of Krzyz - Bydgoszcz (145 km) by the Prussian king, William IV. Before the opening, the station was decorated and a show was held on the square in front of it, during which a regional folk band from Kujawy, who sang in Polish, performed. The first passenger train available for travellers departed from Bydgoszcz on 27 July 1851. In 1853, officials of the Eastern Railway Division moved from the station to purpose-built premises on the New Market.

With the development of rail and transport growth there was demand for an extension of the railway station. One of the main reasons that made the extension necessary was the need to ensure adequate space to base the burgeoning Eastern Railway Headquarters in Bydgoszcz, which managed the construction, operation and maintenance of railway traffic in the eastern provinces of Prussia (east of Berlin).

The station was rebuilt in 1861 and 1870, the latter providing the station with increased passenger processing facilities.

In 1888, the station was linked with the centre of the city by trams, initially using horse traction, and then, from 1896, using a new electrically operated and powered generation of trams. In 1889 officials of the Directorate of Railways left the station premises and moved to a newly built building on Dworcowa Street.

In 1910, after a fire at the station, work began on an entirely new building. This was completed in 1915. The new station building was of massive construction with a hipped roof and square tower in the middle of which was a large clock. On the square in front of the station the decorative lawn was retained, for the use of city residents and visitors; this was then replanted in 1926 in a more ornate form. The railway station building survived the whole interwar period in that design, sustaining only minor damage during the course of World War II.

The final reconstruction of the station was carried out in 1968, giving it a modern form. The steep roof of the building with its clock tower was removed, and the glazed front elevation reconstructed. A pedestrian subway was built beneath Sigismund Augustus street, and the station lawn was removed in favour of a parking lot for cars and buses.

In 2013 PKP appointed Ernst & Young and WS Atkins to undertake a feasibility study for an EU-supported modernisation of the station, planned for 2013–2015.

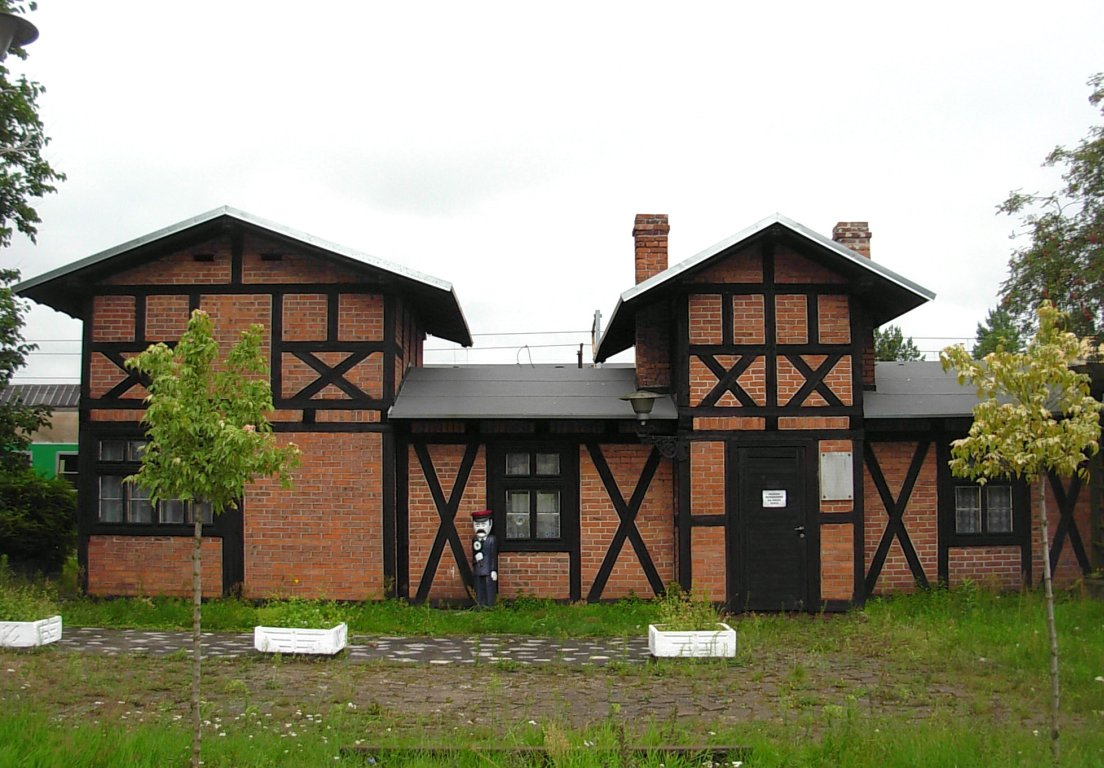
First station building (1849) recently restored

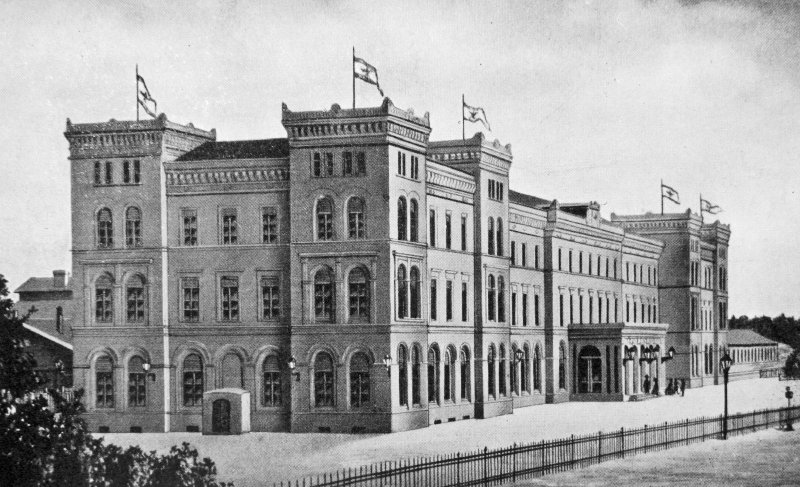
Internal terminal around 1861

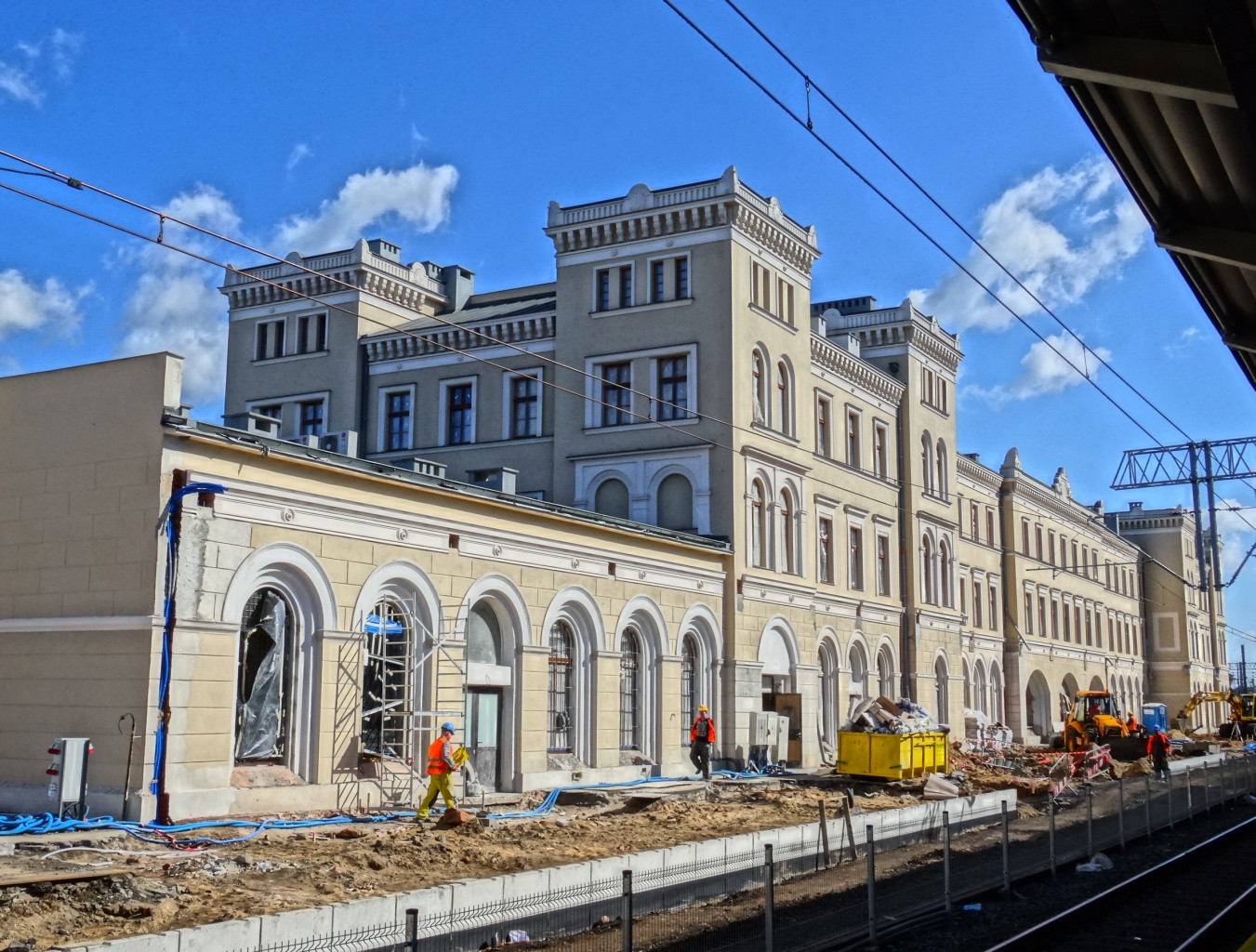
Internal terminal in 2015

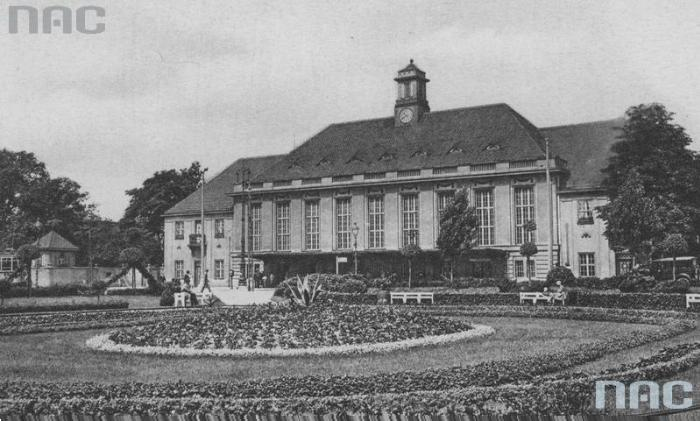
The main station building after the 1915 reconstruction

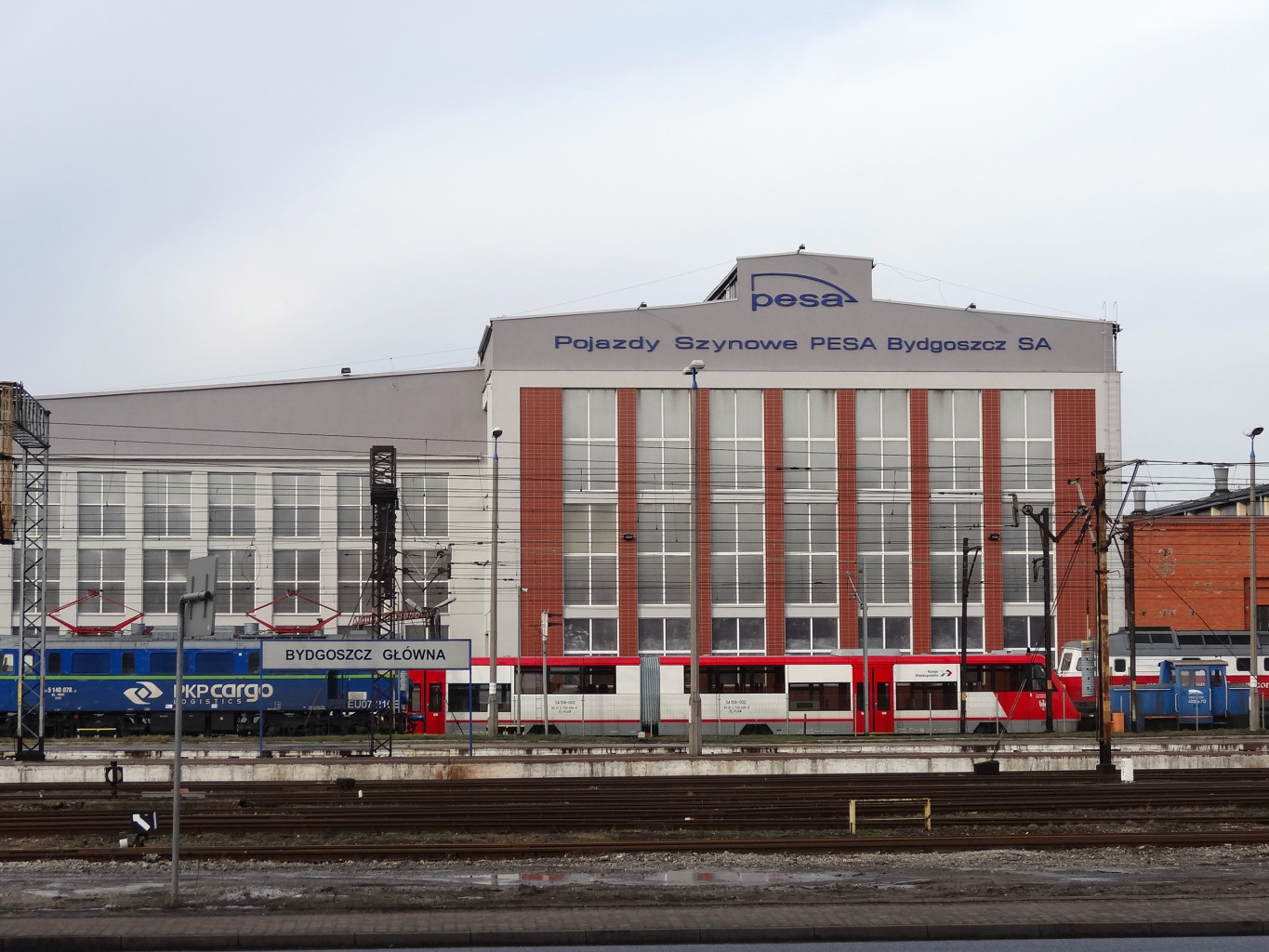
Pesa SA buildings (major Polish rolling stock manufacturer)

== Train services ==
The station is served by the following services:

- EuroCity services (EC) (EC 95 by DB) (IC by PKP) Gdynia - Gdansk - Bydgoszcz - Poznan - Rzepin - Frankfurt (Oder) - Berlin
- Intercity services Gdynia - Gdansk - Bydgoszcz - Poznan - Wroclaw / Zielona Gora
- Intercity services Bydgoszcz - Poznan - Konin - Kutno - Lodz - Krakow
- Intercity services Gdynia - Gdansk - Bydgoszcz - Torun - Kutno - Lowicz - Warsaw - Lublin - Rzeszow - Zagorz / Przemysl
- Intercity services Gdynia - Gdansk - Bydgoszcz - Torun - Kutno - Lodz - Czestochowa - Katowice - Bielsko-Biala
- Intercity services Gdynia - Gdansk - Bydgoszcz - Torun - Kutno - Lodz - Czestochowa - Krakow - Zakopane
- Intercity services Kolobrzeg - Pila - Bydgoszcz - Torun - Kutno - Lowicz - Warsaw
- Intercity services Szczecin - Pila - Bydgoszcz - Torun - Kutno - Lowicz - Warsaw - Lublin - Rzeszow - Przemysl
- Intercity services Gorzow Wielkopolskie - Krzyz - Pila - Bydgoszcz - Torun - Kutno - Lowicz - Warsaw
- Intercity services Szczecin - Stargard - Kalisz Pomorski - Pila - Bydgoszcz
- Regional services (R) Gdynia - Sopot - Gdansk - Tczew - Laskowice - Bydgoszcz
- Regional services (R) Bydgoszcz - Solec Kujawski - Torun
- Regional services (R) Bydgoszcz - Solec Kujawski - Torun - Wloclawek - Kutno
- Regional services (R) Poznan - Gniezno - Mogilno - Inowroclaw - Bydgoszcz
- Regional services (R) Pila - Bydgoszcz
- Regional services (AR416) Chojnice - Wierzchuchin - Bydgoszsz
- Regional services (AR431A) Bydgoszcz - Wierzchucin - Tuchola - Chojnice
- Regional services (AR431B) Bydgoszcz - Laskowice Pomorskie - Grudziądz - Brodnica

Preceding station	PKP Intercity	Following station
Inowrocław towards Berlin Hbf	EuroCity EC 95; IC	Tczew towards Gdynia Główna
Preceding station	Polregio	Following station
Rynkowo Wiadukt towards Gdynia Chylonia	PR	Terminus
Terminus	PR	Bydgoszcz Leśna towards Toruń Wschodni
Terminus	PR	Bydgoszcz Leśna towards Kutno
Bydgoszcz Zachód towards Piła Główna	PR	Terminus
Trzciniec towards Poznań Główny	PR	Terminus
Preceding station	Arriva RP	Following station
Bydgoszcz Leśna towards Chełmża	AR416	Terminus
Terminus	AR431A	Bydgoszcz Leśna towards Chojnice
Terminus	AR431B	Bydgoszcz Leśna towards Brodnica
