= Warsaw–Gdańsk railway =

Railway line in Poland

Overview
- Status: Operational
- Locale: Poland
- Termini: Warsaw; Gdańsk

Service
- Type: Heavy rail
- Route number: 9

History
- Opened: 1852; 174 years ago

Technical
- Line length: 323.393 km (200.947 mi)
- Track gauge: 1,435 mm (4 ft 8 1/2 in) standard gauge
- Electrification: 3000 V DC
- Operating speed: 200 km/h (125 mph)

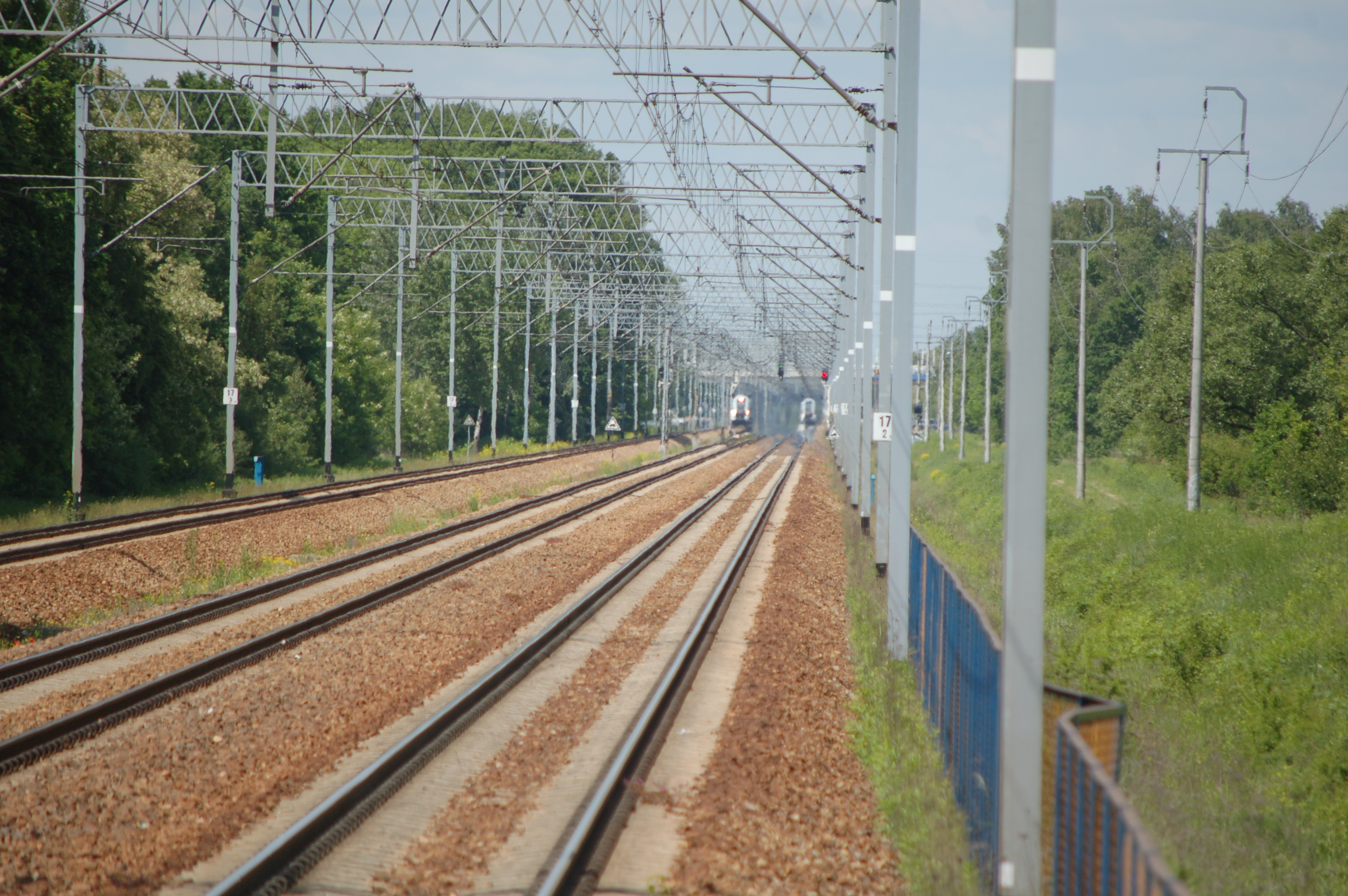
Warsaw–Gdańsk railway near the Warszawa Płudy railway station

The Warsaw–Gdańsk railway is a 323-kilometre-long (201 mi) Polish railway line, that connects Warsaw with Iława, Malbork, Tczew, Gdańsk and further along the coast to Gdynia.

== Opening ==
The line was opened in stages between 1852 and 1877. Today's Line 9 was created separately in the Russian zone and German zone. It was built as part of the Prussian Eastern Railway linking Berlin with Königsberg (today's Kaliningrad).

Date	Section
6 August 1852	Gdańsk - Tczew
12 October 1857	Tczew - Malbork
1 September 1876	Malbork - Iława
1877	Iława - Warsaw

The line is double track throughout. The last single-track section between Mikolajki Pomorskie and Malbork was doubled to two tracks in 1967.

== Electrification ==
Electrification took place in six stages between 1969 and 1985:

- 1969 - electrification of section Gdańsk - Tczew
- 1972 - electrification of section Warsaw - Nasielsk
- 1983-1985 - electrification of section of Nasielsk - Tczew

== Modernisation ==
Between 2006 and 2014 the line was completely modernised and made suitable for passenger trains to travel at 200 km/h (120 mph) (160 km/h (100 mph) for trains without ETCS) and 120 km/h (75 mph) for freight trains with axle loads of 22.5 tonnes or more. Before modernisation speed on the line was between 80 and 120 km/h (50 and 75 mph). The cost of modernisation cost about PLN 10 billion, which gives an approximate cost of PLN 31 million per kilometer of the route. The modernisation allowed the fastest train from Warszawa Centralna station to reach Gdańsk Główny station in 2 hours and 25 minutes.

== Usage ==
The line sees trains of various categories.

- Express InterCity Premium, Express InterCity, Intercity and TLK services along the whole route
- Regional services

== See also ==
- Railway lines of Poland
