= Olsztyn Główny railway station =

Main railway station of Olsztyn, Poland

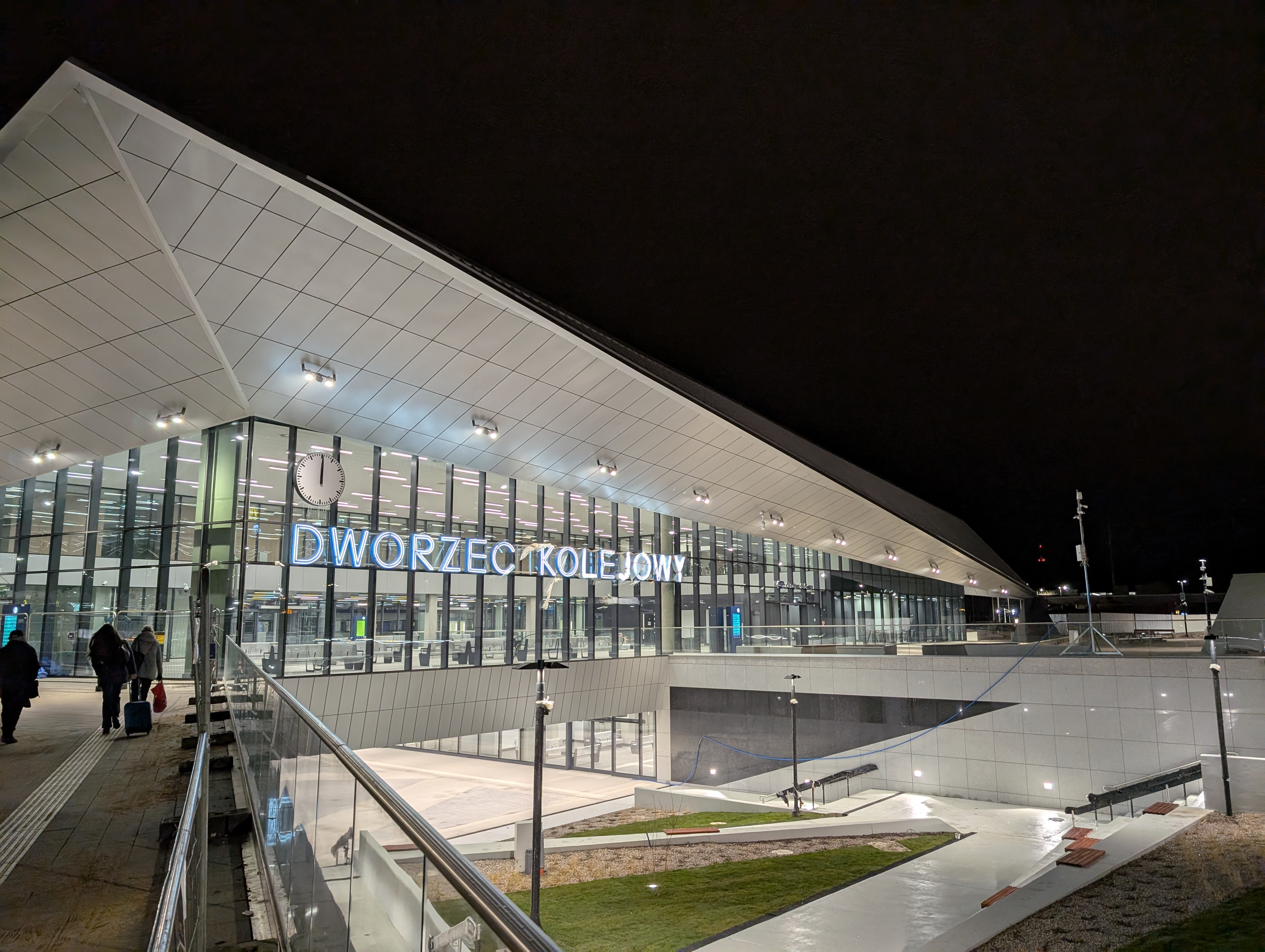
- New station building

General information
- Location: Olsztyn, Warmian-Masurian Voivodeship; Poland
- Coordinates: 53.7856553°N 20.4972517°E
- System: Railway Station
- Owner: Polskie Koleje Państwowe S.A.
- Platforms: 8

History
- Opened: 1872; 154 years ago
- Former names: Allenstein Hauptbahnhof

Services
Preceding station	PKP Intercity	Following station
Olsztyn Zachodni towards Szczecin Główny	IC	Terminus
Olsztyn Zachodni towards Bielsko-Biała Główna or Racibórz	IC	Terminus
Olsztyn Zachodni towards Łódź Fabryczna	IC	Terminus
Preceding station	Polregio	Following station
Olsztyn Zachodni towards Gdynia Chylonia	PR	Terminus
Terminus	PR	Klewki towards Ostrołęka
Olsztyn Śródmieście towards Braniewo	PR	Klewki towards Szczytno
Terminus	PR	Olsztyn Śródmieście towards Elbląg
Olsztyn Śródmieście towards Toruń Główny	PR	Terminus
Location

Olsztyn Główny (Polish for Olsztyn Main station) is a railway station in Olsztyn in the Warmian-Masurian Voivodeship in north-eastern Poland.

According to the classification of passenger stations in Poland, it is categorised as a voivodeship station. In 2024, the station served approximately 9,600 passengers a day making it the 39th busiest station in Poland.

== History ==
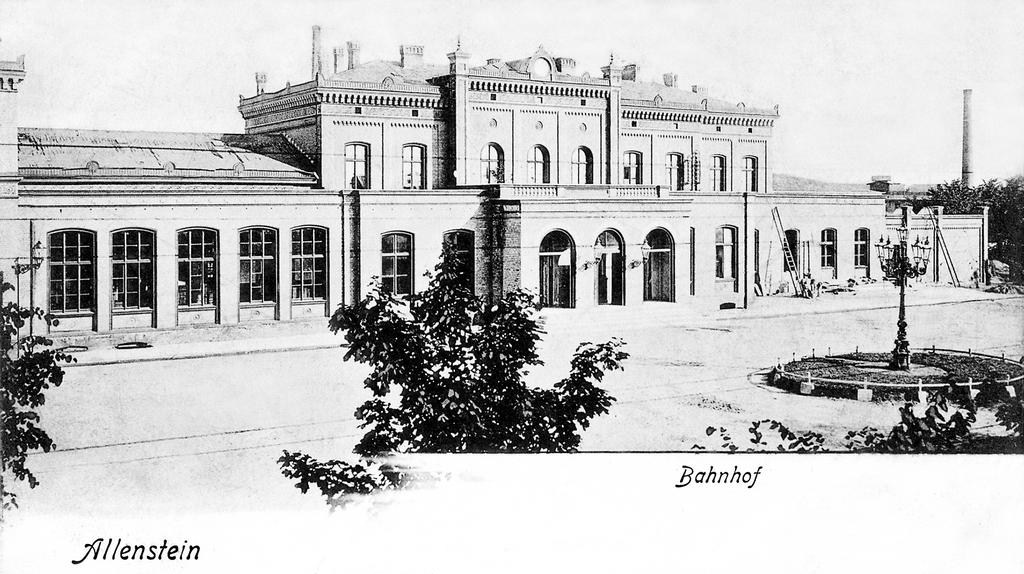
Allenstein Bahnhof

The construction of the Main Railway Station in Olsztyn was completed on December 1, 1872. In 1907, a tram connection opened connecting the station with the city centre. In 1914, the station was renamed to Allenstein Hbf; previously, it was only called Allenstein. The old tram lines were closed in 1967. In 2015, a new tram line was opened.

During World War II, the station burned down. The reconstruction and modernisation of the destroyed building was completed in 1948, the new station served the city for twenty years, after which it was dismantled and replaced by a new building in 1971.

In August 2022, the station building dating from 1971 was demolished for the beginning of the construction of a new station building and new platforms. The grand opening of the new station was held on 21 February 2025.

== Train services ==
The station is served by the following service(s):

- Intercity services (IC) Szczecin - Koszalin - Słupsk - Lębork - Gdynia - Gdańsk - Malbork - Elbląg/Iława - Olsztyn
- Intercity services (IC) Olsztyn - Warszawa - Skierniewice - Łódź
- Intercity services (IC) Olsztyn - Warszawa - Skierniewice - Częstochowa - Katowice - Bielsko-Biała
- Intercity services (IC) Olsztyn - Warszawa - Skierniewice - Częstochowa - Katowice - Gliwice - Racibórz
- Regional services (R) Braniewo — Olsztyn Główny — Szczytno
- Regional services (R) Elbląg — Olsztyn Główny
- Regional services (R) Gdynia Chylonia — Olsztyn Główny
- Regional services (R) Olsztyn Główny — Szczytno — Chorzele — Ostrołęka
- Regional services (R) Toruń Główny — Jabłonowo Pomorskie — Iława — Olsztyn

== Gallery ==
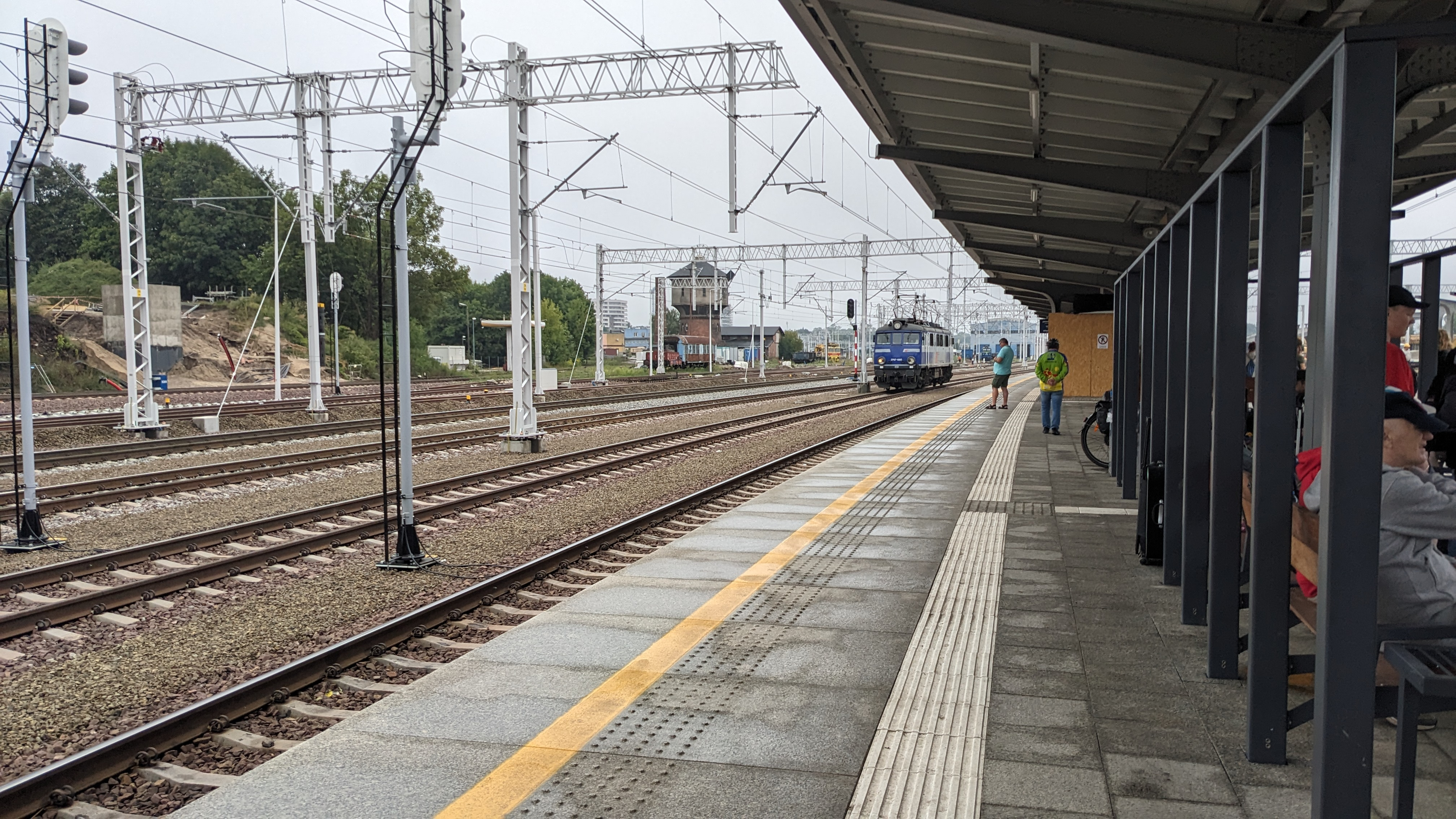
New platforms

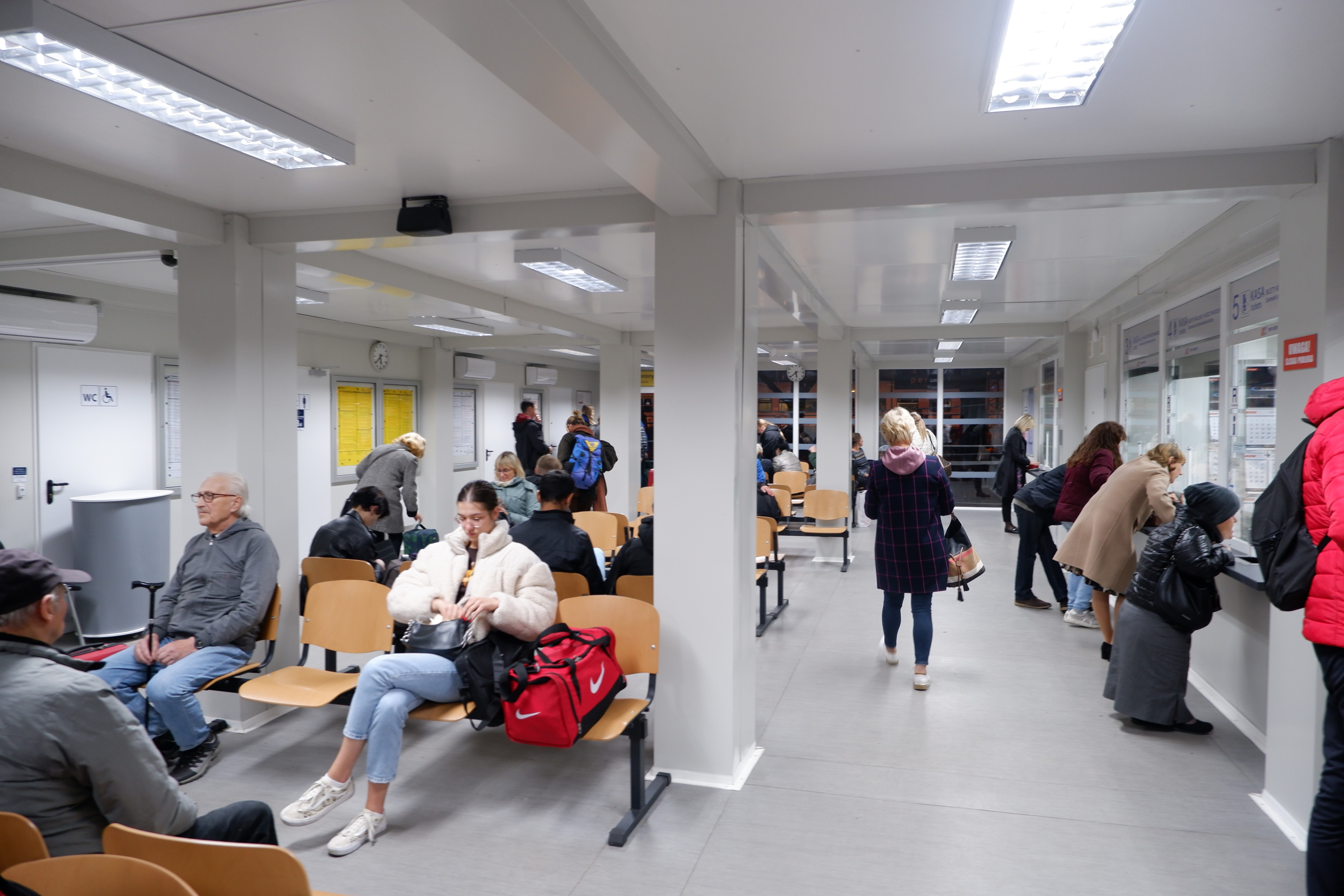
Temporary station building during reconstruction in 2022

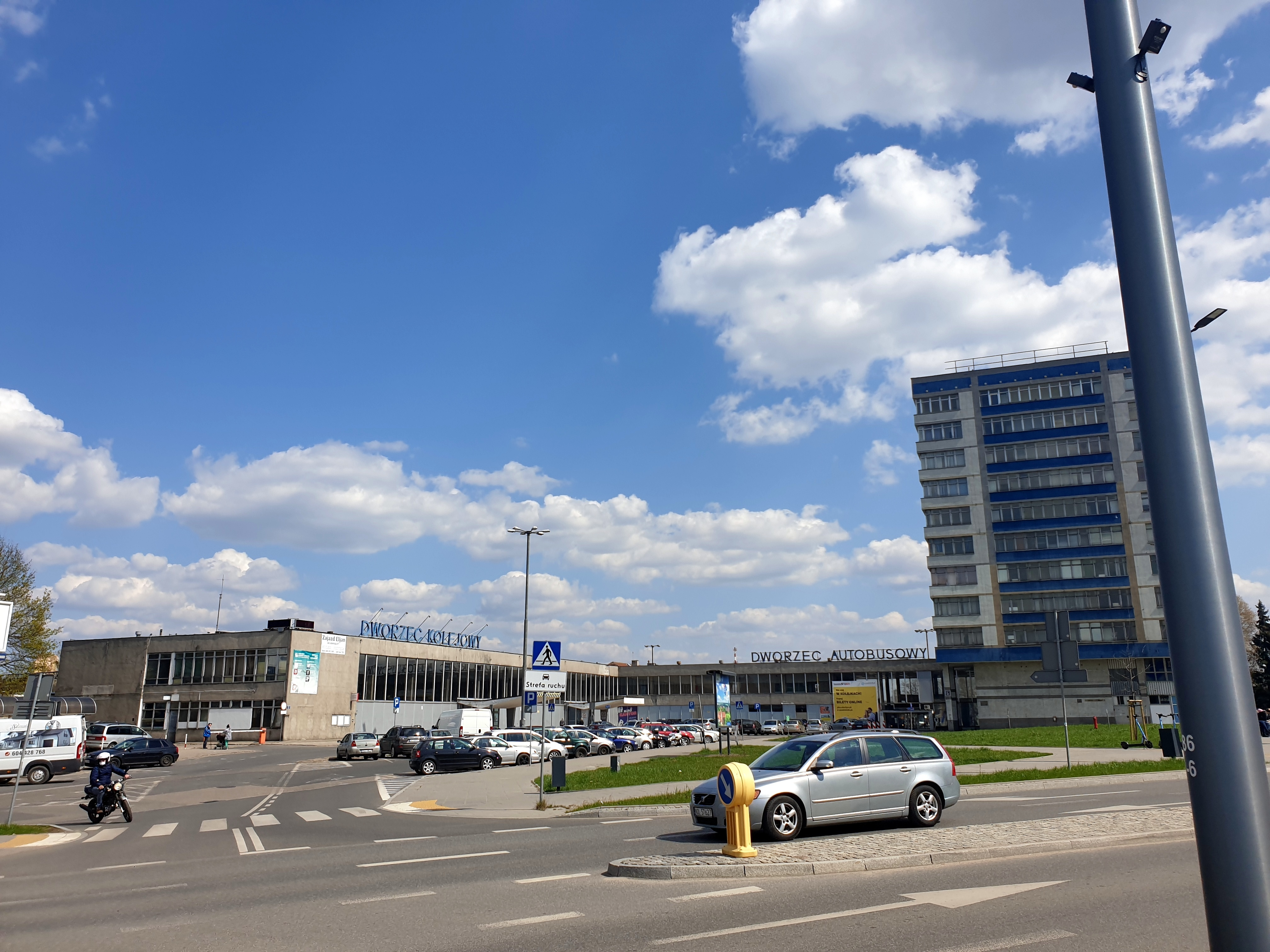
Station buildings in 2021, prior to reconstructions
