= Sulmin =

- Village
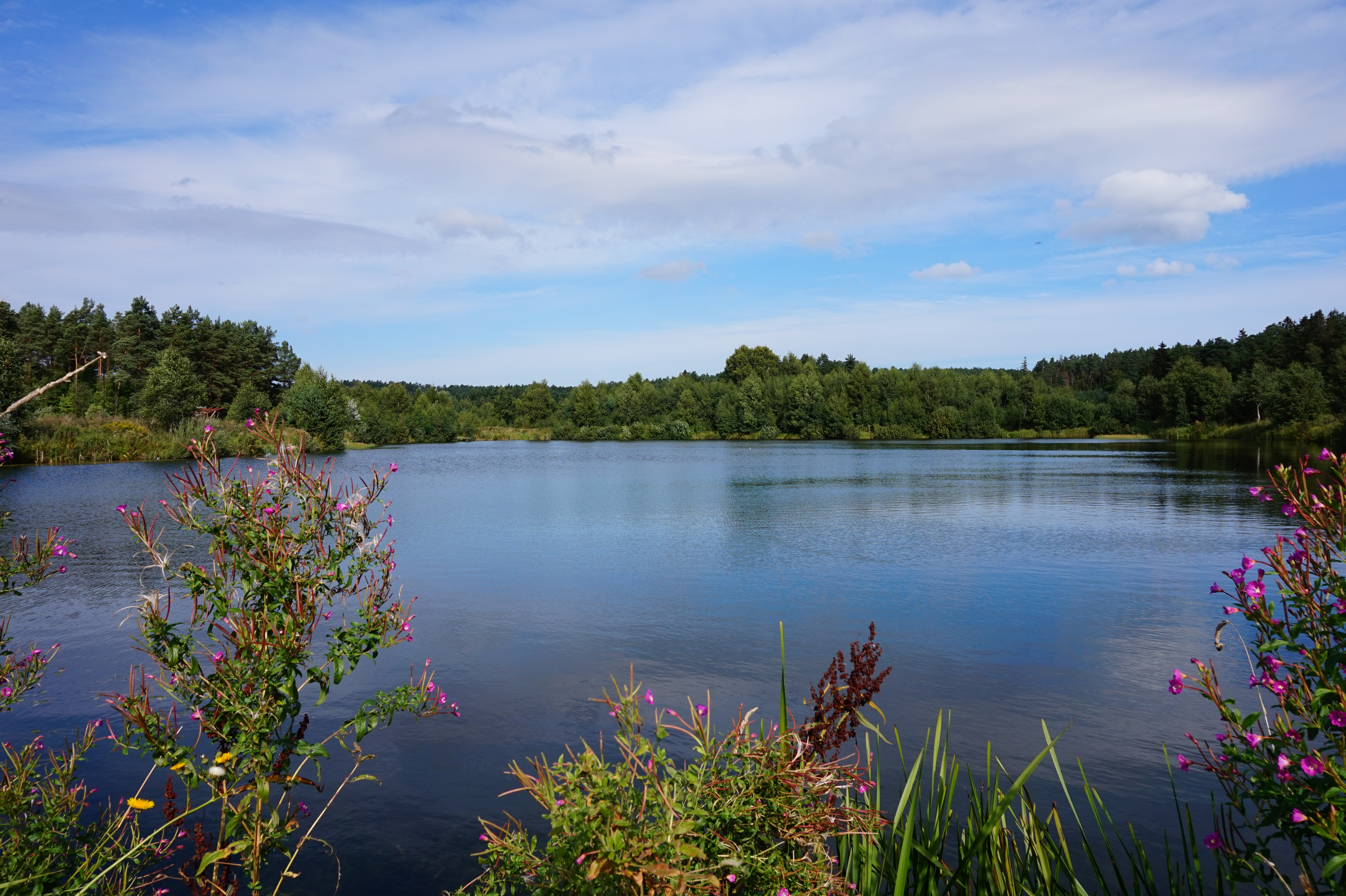
- Reservoir in Sulmin

- Location within Poland
- Coordinates: 54°18′51″N 18°28′14″E
- Country: Poland
- Voivodeship: Pomeranian
- County: Kartuzy
- Gmina: Żukowo
- Population: 394
- Time zone: UTC+1 (CET)
  - Summer (DST): UTC+2 (CEST)

Sulmin [ˈsulmin] is a village in the administrative district of Gmina Żukowo, within Kartuzy County, Pomeranian Voivodeship, in northern Poland.

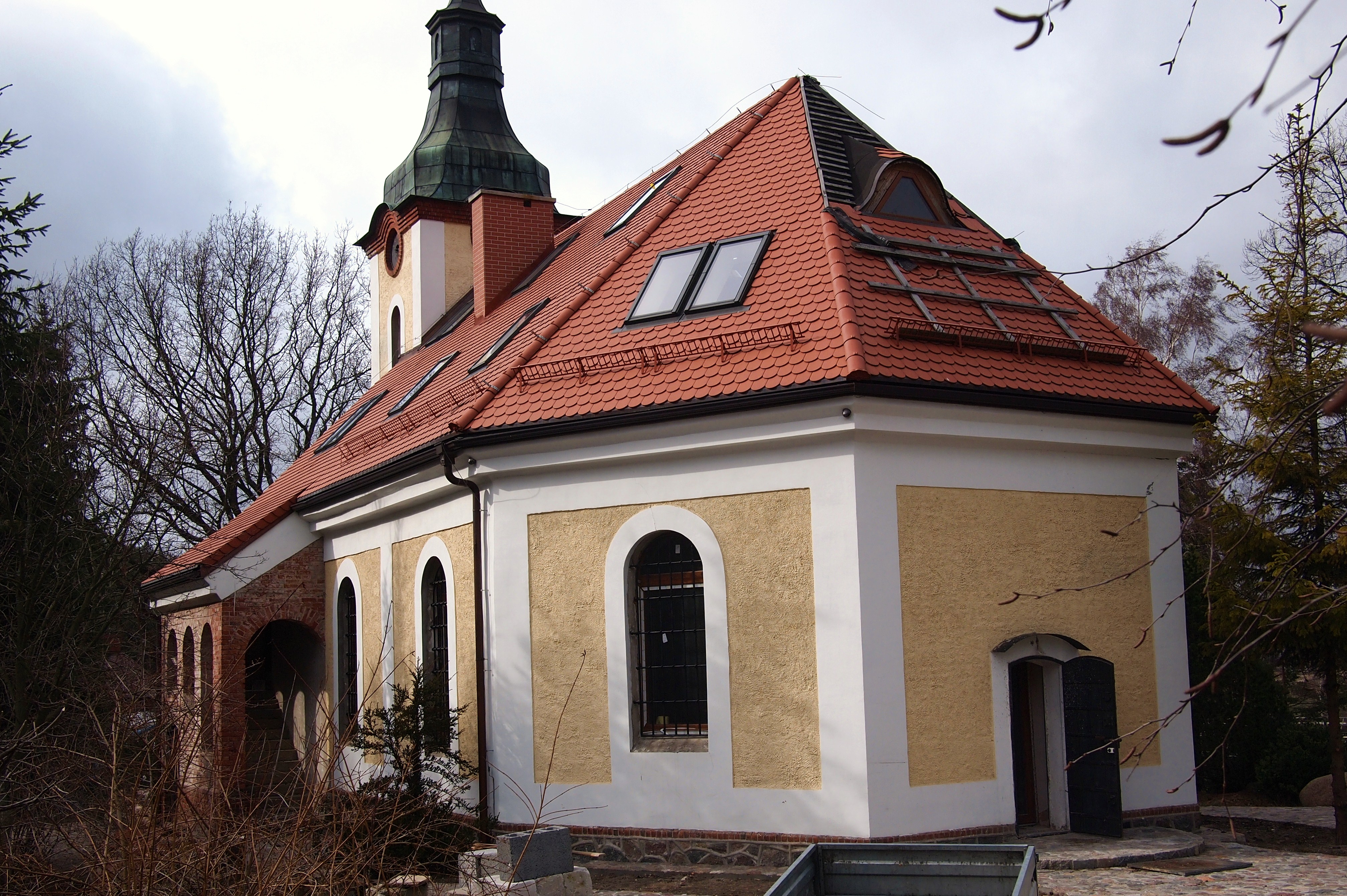
Church of Sulmin (built 1905–1906)

== History ==
Sulmin was a royal village of the Polish Crown, administratively located in the Gdańsk County in the Pomeranian Voivodeship. Older versions of the village's name are Sulmink, Solemyn and Zullmin. Sulmin was annexed by Prussia in 1772 in the First Partition of Poland, and from 1871 to 1920 it also was part of Germany, administratively in the Danziger Höhe district of the Province of West Prussia. Up to the turn from the 19th to the 20th century Sulmin had been an estate. Around that time the factory owner Hartmann from Langfuhr bought the estates of Sulmin, Ottomin, Hochkelpin, Smengorschin and Nestempohl comprising an area of about 30.7 km^{2} (11.9 sq mi) for 1.2 Million Mark for settling purposes. It had been expected that the garrison of Danzig would require a larger training area. After it turned out that the military had no need for this terrain, Hartman offered it for sale to the Prussian settling commission for Poznań and West Prussia (Preußische Ansiedlungskommission für Posen und Westpreußen). The latter organization gradually brought families of Protestant German settlers into the area, most of them being former colonists from Russia, to where they had emigrated a century ago or even earlier and where in recent times they had been subjected to political pressure. Other settlers came from Brandenburg, Pomerania, Silesia, Westfalia and Thuringia. In the framework of this campaign 95 parcels were generated in the area, 21 of them in Sulmin, 11 in Otomino, 23 in Smęgorzyno and Kiełpino Górne as well as 40 in Niestępowo.

In 1905 a school was built, and the laying for the foundation stone of a new church took place, which was opened in 1906.

After World War I, Poland regained independence, and in 1920, Sulmin was reintegrated with Poland, according to the regulations of the Treaty of Versailles. During World War II (1939–1945) the region was under German occupation. At the beginning of March 1945, shortly before the end of World War II, the area was occupied by the Red Army. After the end of the war it was restored to Poland.

For details of the history of the region, see History of Pomerania.

=== Number of inhabitants by year ===
1895	244
1805	296
1810	270
2008	394

=== Parish ===
The population present in Sulmin prior to 1920 was predominantly Protestant. On August 15, 1907, Sulmin became a self-consistent parish. In 1938 the church books were in Löblau.

== Notable people ==
- Henryk Derwich (1921–1983), Polish cartoonist
- Maciej Kosycarz (1964–2020), Polish photojournalist

== Literature ==
- Wilhelm Brauer (ed.): Der Kreis Karthaus - Ein westpreußisches Heimatbuch, Radke, Lübeck 1978, in particular pp. 220–221 (in German).
