= Pępowo Kartuskie railway station =

Railway station in Poland

Pępowo Kartuskie
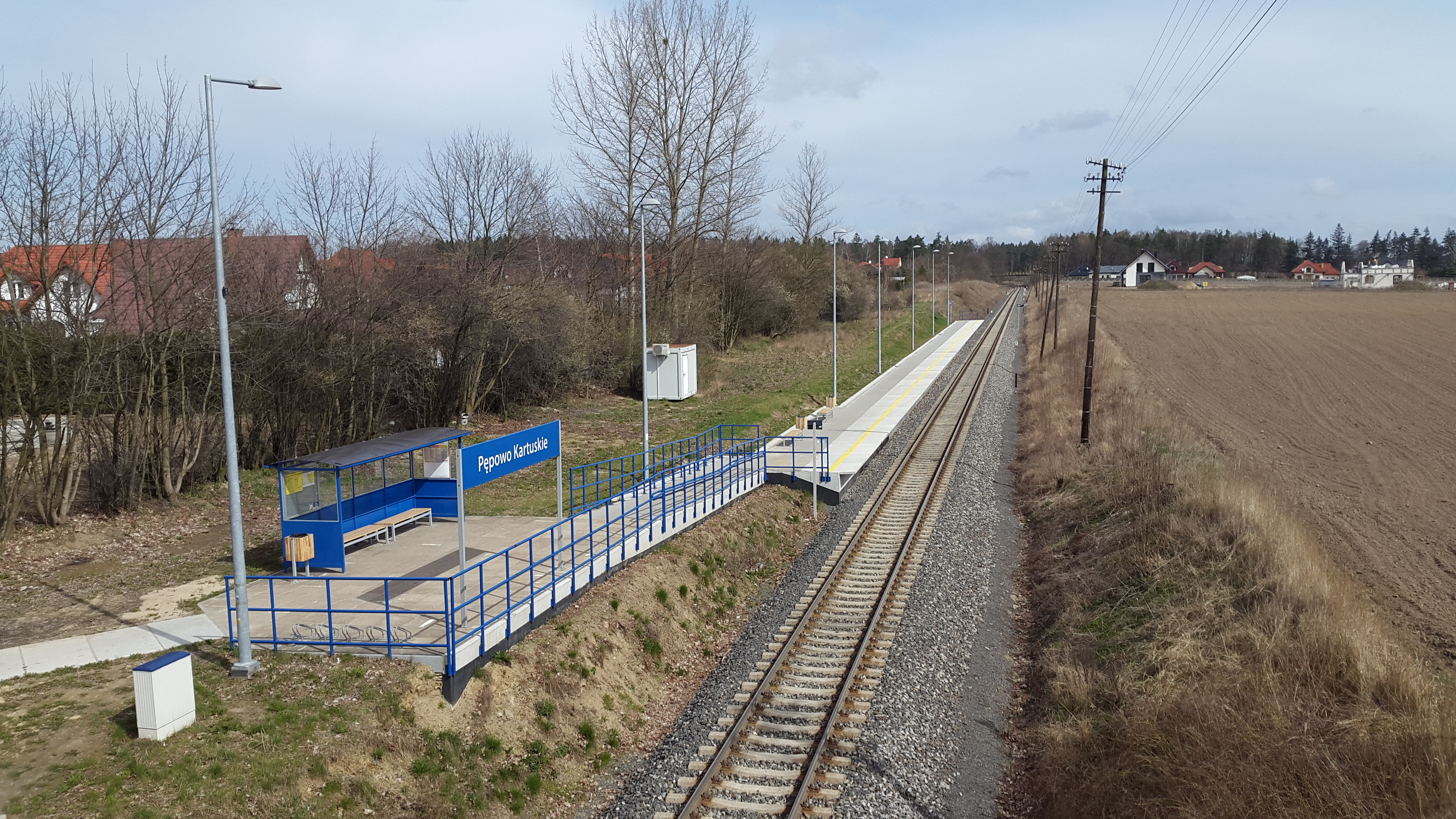
- Pępowo Kartuskie railway station

General information
- Location: Pepowo, Pomeranian Voivodeship; Poland
- System: Railway Station
- Operator: SKM Tricity
- Line: 201: Nowa Wieś Wielka–Gdynia Port railway
- Platforms: 1
- Tracks: 1

History
- Opened: 1938; 88 years ago
- Rebuilt: 2014
Location
- Location within Poland

Pępowo Kartuskie railway station is a railway station serving the town of Pępowo, in the Pomeranian Voivodeship, Poland. The station opened in 1938 and is located on the Nowa Wieś Wielka–Gdynia Port railway. The train services are operated by SKM Tricity.

== Modernisation ==
In 2014 the station was modernised as part of the works for the Pomorska Kolej Metropolitalna.

== Train services ==
The station is served by the following services:

- Pomorska Kolej Metropolitalna services (R) Kościerzyna — Gdańsk Port Lotniczy (Airport) — Gdańsk Wrzeszcz — Gdynia Główna
- Pomorska Kolej Metropolitalna services (R) Kościerzyna — Gdańsk Osowa — Gdynia Główna

Preceding station	Polregio	Following station
Żukowo Wschodnie towards Kościerzyna	PR (Via Gdańsk Osowa)	Rębiechowo towards Gdynia Główna
Żukowo Wschodnie towards Kościerzyna	PR (Via Gdańsk Port Lotniczy (Airport) and Gdańsk Wrzeszcz)	Rębiechowo towards Gdynia Główna
