= Niestępowo railway station =

Railway station in Niestępowo, Poland

Coordinates: 54°18′55″N 18°26′41″E

Niestępowo

General information
- Location: Niestępowo; Poland
- Owner: Polskie Koleje Państwowe S.A.

Construction
- Structure type: Building: Never existed Depot: Never existed Water tower: Never existed
Location

Niestępowo is a non-operational PKP railway station in Niestępowo (Pomeranian Voivodeship), Poland.

== Lines crossing the station ==
Start station	End station	Line type
Pruszcz Gdański	Łeba	Closed
