= Kiełpinek railway station =

Railway station in Gdańsk, Poland

Coordinates: 54°21′17″N 18°31′49″E

Kiełpinek
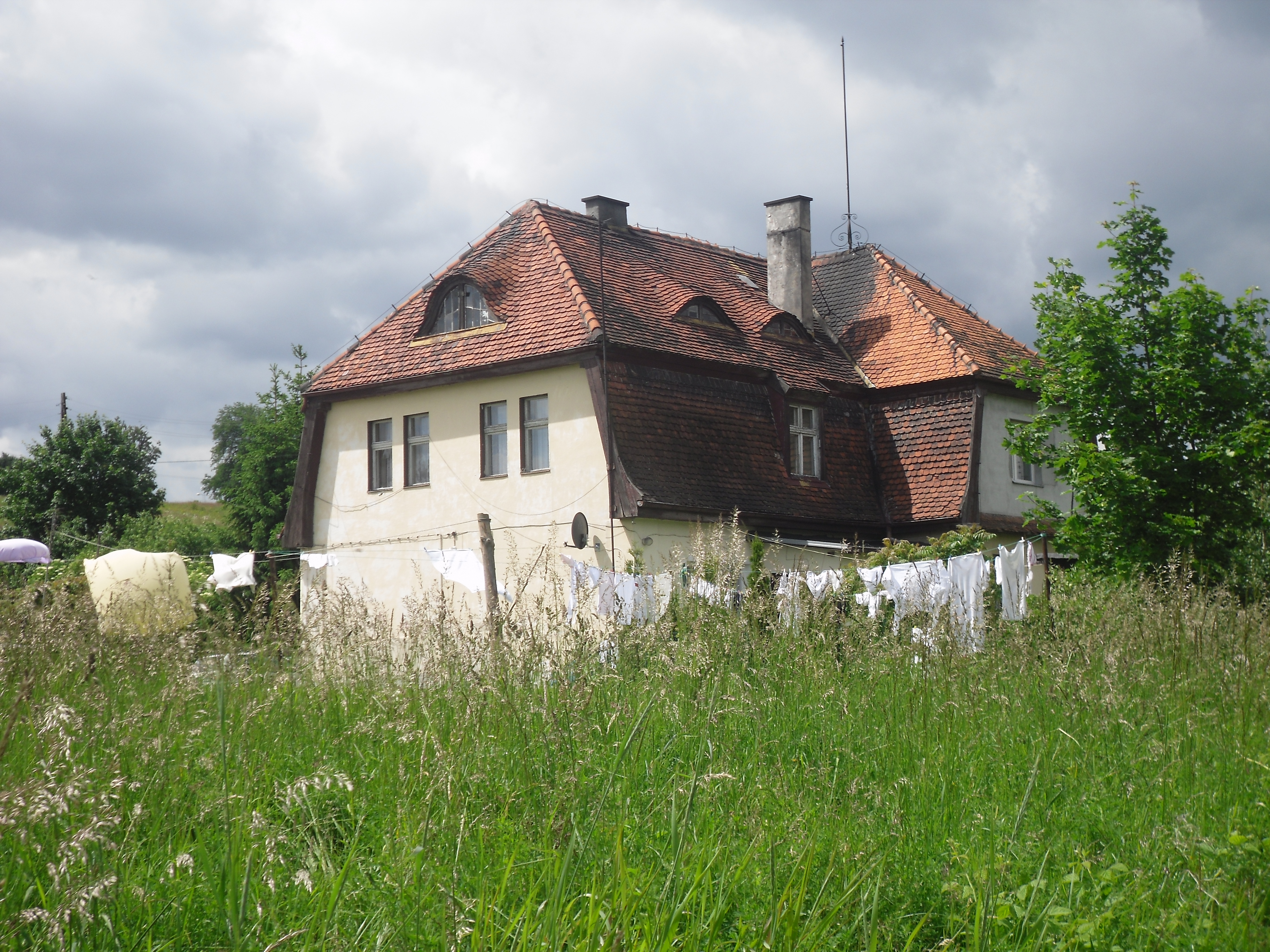

General information
- Location: Kiełpinek; Poland
- Owner: Polskie Koleje Państwowe S.A.

Construction
- Structure type: Building: Yes (no longer used); Depot: Never existed Water tower: Never existed

History
- Former names: Klein Kelpin until 1945
Location

Kiełpinek is a non-operational PKP railway station in Kiełpinek (Pomeranian Voivodeship), Poland.

== Lines crossing the station ==
| Start station | End station | Line type |
|---|---|---|
| Gdańsk Wrzeszcz | Stara Piła | Dismantled |
