= Dzierżążno railway station =

Railway station in Dzierżążno, Poland

Dzierżążno
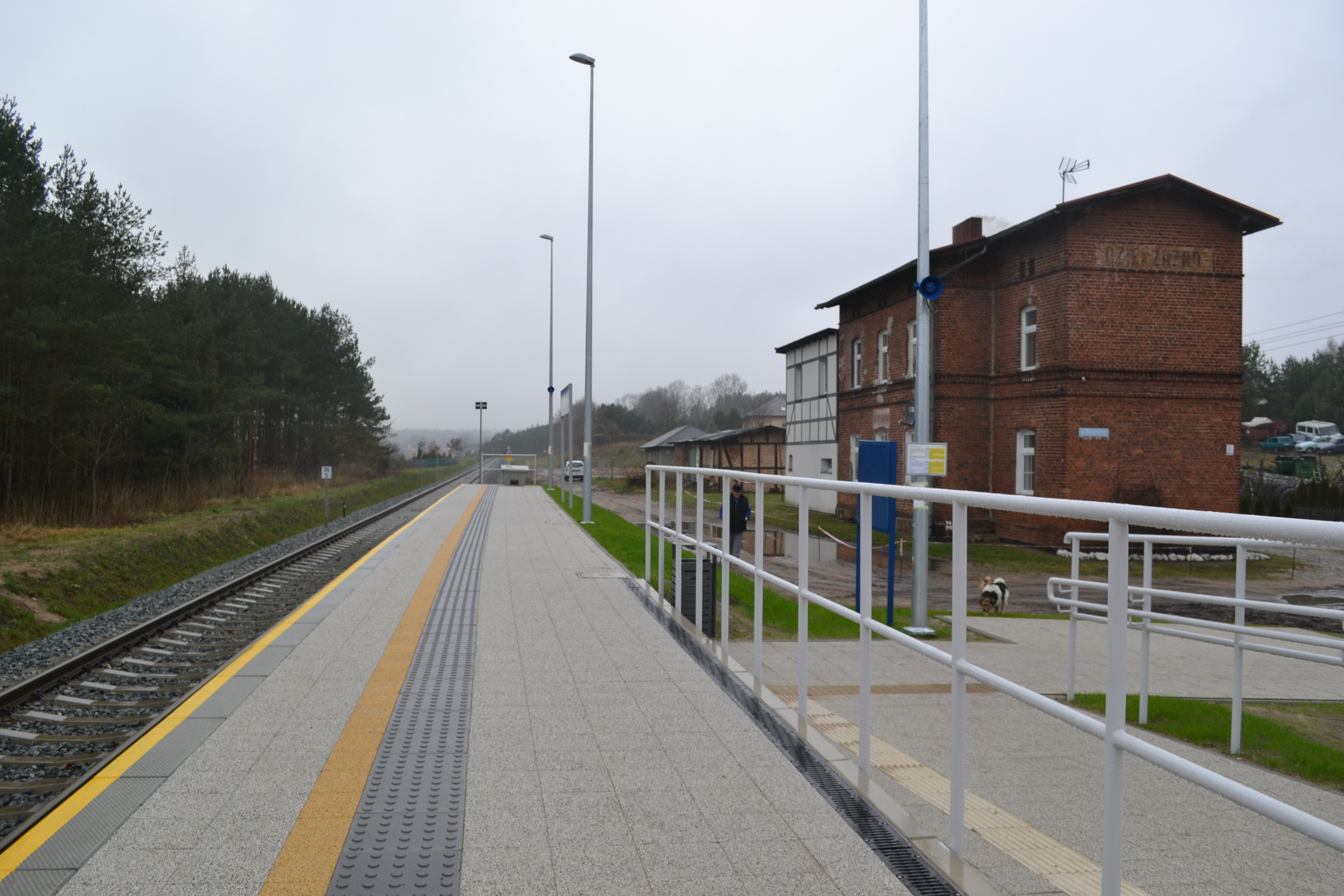
- Dzierżążno railway station

General information
- Location: Dzierżążno, Pomeranian Voivodeship; Poland
- System: Railway Station
- Operator: SKM Tricity
- Line: 229: Pruszcz Gdański–Łeba railway
- Platforms: 1
- Tracks: 1

History
- Closed: 1994
- Rebuilt: 1 October 2015; 10 years ago
- Former names: Seeresen (until 1945)
Location
- Location within Poland

Dzierżążno railway station is a railway station in the village of Dzierżążno, in the Pomeranian Voivodeship, Poland. The original railway through Dzierżążno opened in 1886. The station was closed in 1994, when train services on the line between Pruszcz Gdański and Kartuzy ceased. Modernisation of the line and the rebuilding of the stations took place between May and September 2015. The station re-opened on 1 October 2015 and is located on the Pruszcz Gdański–Łeba railway. The train services are operated by SKM Tricity as part of the Pomorska Kolej Metropolitalna (PKM).

== Train services ==
The station is served by the following services:

- Pomorska Kolej Metropolitalna services (R) Kartuzy — Gdańsk Port Lotniczy (Airport) — Gdańsk Główny

Preceding station	Polregio	Following station
Borkowo towards Gdańsk Główny	PR (Via Gdańsk Port Lotniczy (Airport))	Kartuzy Terminus
