= Rębiechowo railway station =

Railway station in Kartuzy County, Poland

Rębiechowo
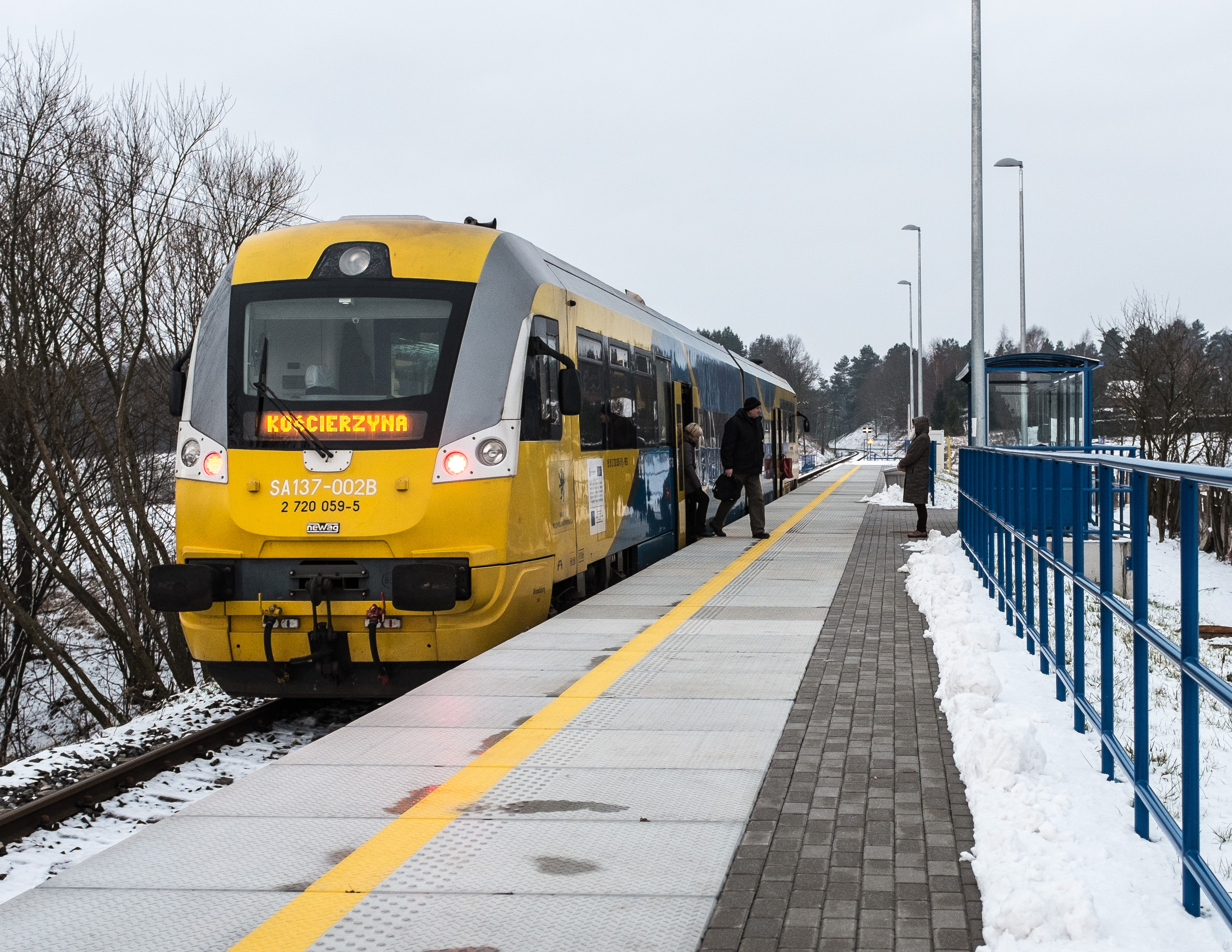
- Rębiechowo railway station

General information
- Location: Rębiechowo, Pomeranian Voivodeship; Poland
- Coordinates: 54.3886°N 18.4214°E
- System: Railway Station
- Operator: SKM Tricity
- Lines: 201: Nowa Wieś Wielka–Gdynia Port railway 253: Gdańsk Rębiechowo–Rębiechowo railway
- Platforms: 1
- Tracks: 1

History
- Opened: 1938; 88 years ago
- Rebuilt: 2014
Location
- Location within Poland

Rębiechowo railway station is a railway station serving the town of Rębiechowo, in the Pomeranian Voivodeship, Poland. The station opened in 1938 and is located on the Nowa Wieś Wielka–Gdynia Port railway and Gdańsk Rębiechowo–Rębiechowo railway. The train services are operated by SKM Tricity.

== Modernisation ==
In 2014 the station was modernised as part of the works for the Pomorska Kolej Metropolitalna.

== Train services ==
The station is served by the following services:

- Pomorska Kolej Metropolitalna services (R) Kościerzyna — Gdańsk Port Lotniczy (Airport) — Gdańsk Wrzeszcz — Gdynia Główna
- Pomorska Kolej Metropolitalna services (R) Kościerzyna — Gdańsk Osowa — Gdynia Główna

Preceding station	Polregio	Following station
Pępowo Kartuskie towards Kościerzyna	PR (Via Gdańsk Osowa)	Gdańsk Osowa towards Gdynia Główna
Pępowo Kartuskie towards Kościerzyna	PR (Via Gdańsk Port Lotniczy (Airport) and Gdańsk Wrzeszcz)	Gdańsk Rębiechowo towards Gdynia Główna
