= Borkowo railway station =

Railway station in Kartuzy County, Poland

Borkowo
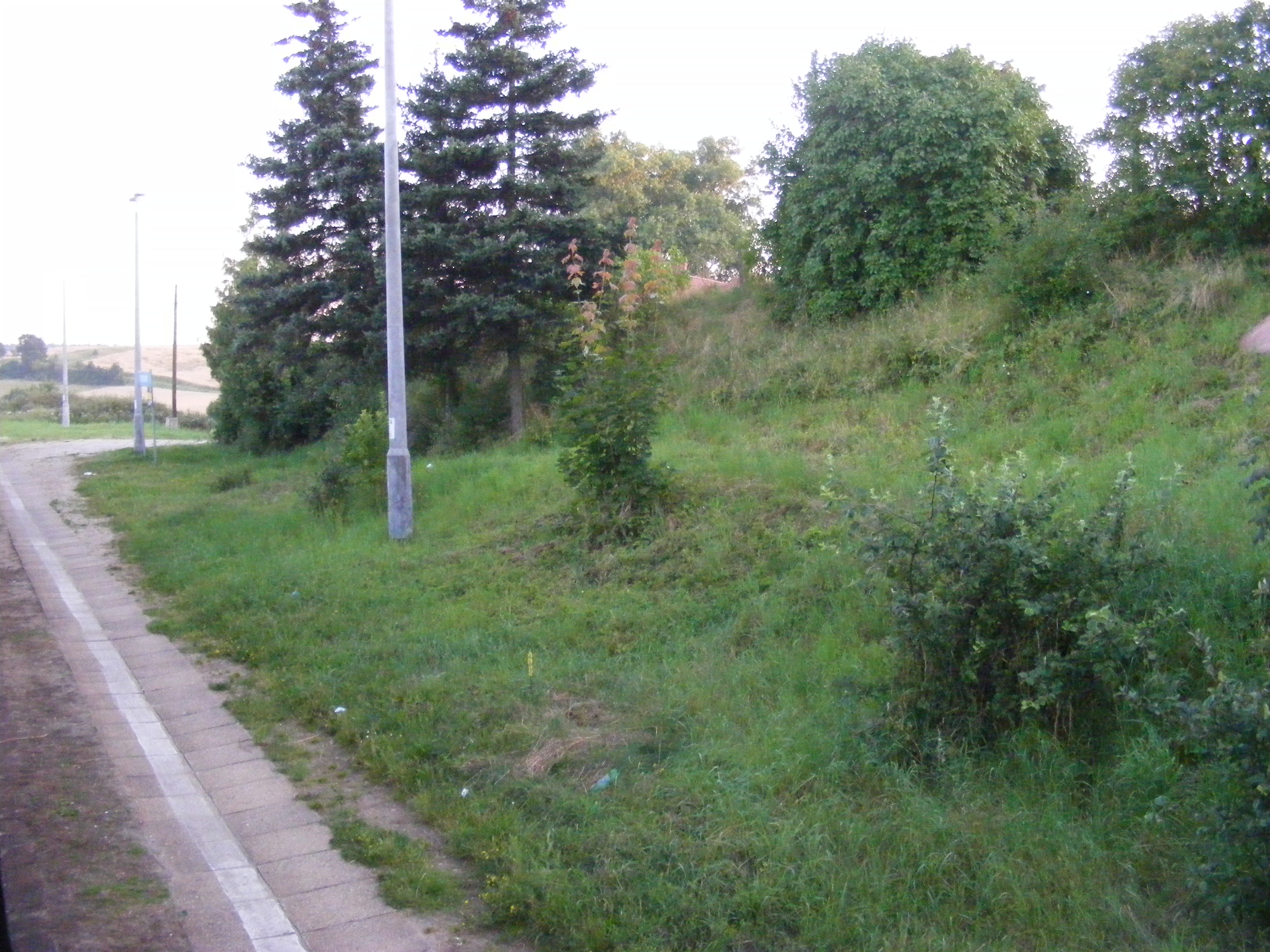
- Borkowo railway station

General information
- Location: Borkowo, Pomeranian Voivodeship; Poland
- Operator: SKM Tricity
- Line: Nowa Wieś Wielka–Gdynia Port
- Platforms: 1
- Tracks: 1

History
- Opened: 1938; 88 years ago
- Rebuilt: 2014-2015
Location
- Location within Poland

Borkowo railway station is a railway station serving the town of Borkowo, in the Pomeranian Voivodeship, Poland. The station opened in 1938 and is located on the Nowa Wieś Wielka–Gdynia Port railway. The train services are operated by SKM Tricity.

== Modernisation ==
In 2014 the station was modernised. In 2015 the railway south of the station was renovated as part of the works for the Pomorska Kolej Metropolitalna, introducing a crossover with the Pruszcz Gdanski–Leba railway to allow trains to operate to Kartuzy.

== Train services ==
The station is served by the following services:

- Pomorska Kolej Metropolitalna services (PR) Kartuzy - Gdańsk Port Lotniczy (Airport) - Gdańsk Główny
- Pomorska Kolej Metropolitalna services (PR) Kościerzyna - Gdańsk Port Lotniczy (Airport) - Gdańsk Wrzeszcz - Gdynia Główna
- Pomorska Kolej Metropolitalna services (PR) Kościerzyna - Gdańsk Osowa - Gdynia Główna

Preceding station	Polregio	Following station
Żukowo towards Gdańsk Główny	PR (Via Gdańsk Port Lotniczy (Airport))	Dzierżążno towards Kartuzy
Babi Dół towards Kościerzyna	PR (Via Gdańsk Osowa)	Żukowo towards Gdynia Główna
Babi Dół towards Kościerzyna	PR (Via Gdańsk Port Lotniczy (Airport) and Gdańsk Wrzeszcz)	Żukowo towards Gdynia Główna
