= Czaple, Kartuzy County =

Czaple
- Village
- Location within Poland
- Coordinates: 54°21′50″N 18°25′57″E
- Country: Poland
- Voivodeship: Pomeranian
- County: Kartuzy
- Gmina: Żukowo
- Population: 190
- Time zone: UTC+1 (CET)
  - Summer (DST): UTC+2 (CEST)

Czaple [ˈt͡ʂaplɛ] is a village in the administrative district of Gmina Żukowo, within Kartuzy County, Pomeranian Voivodeship, in northern Poland. It is located within the historic region of Pomerania.

Czaple was a royal village of the Polish Crown, administratively located in the Gdańsk County in the Pomeranian Voivodeship.
