= Miszewo, Kartuzy County =

Miszewo
- Village
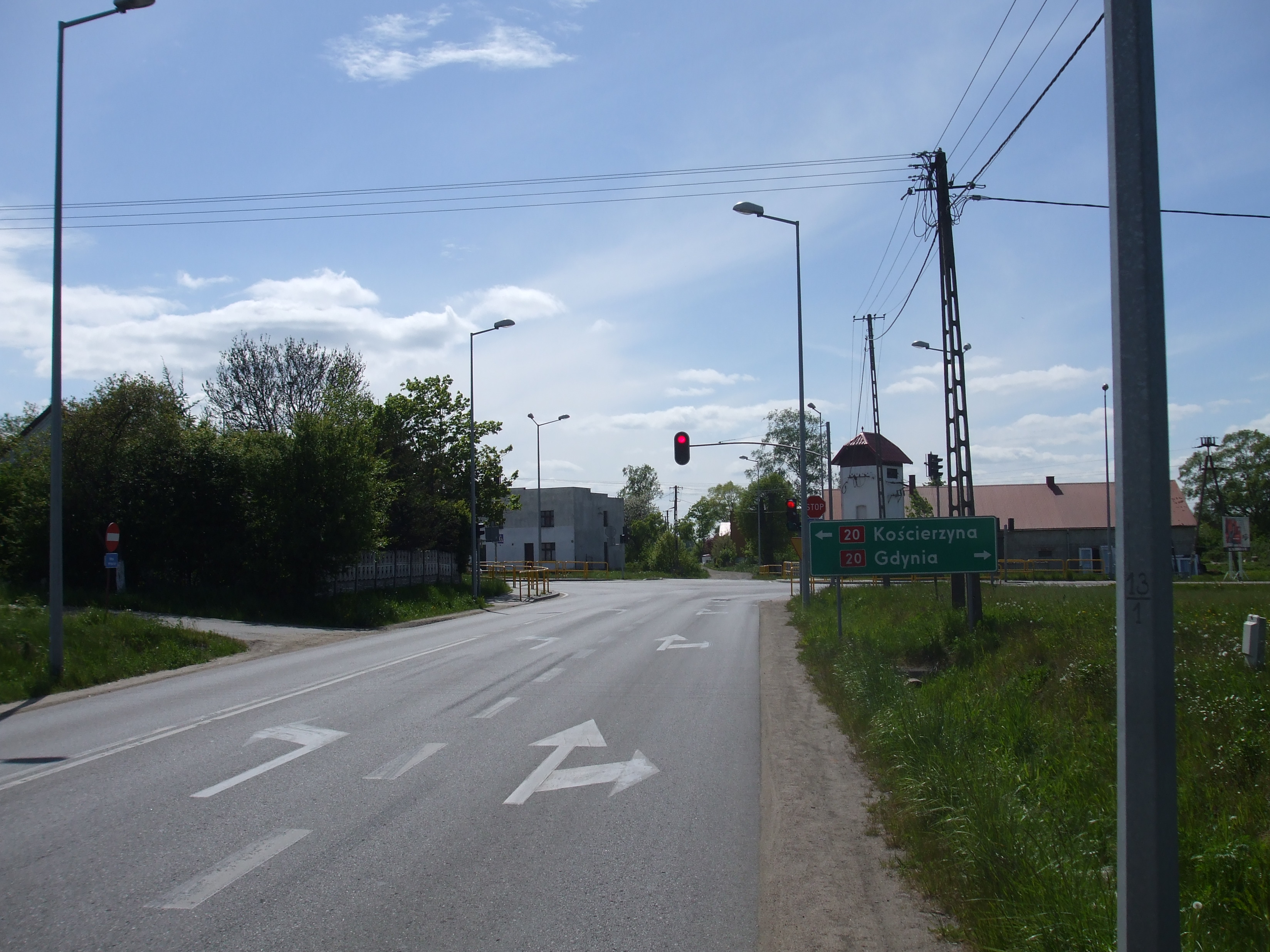
- Intersection of the streets Gdyńska (national road 20), Lotnicza, and Rolnicza in Miszewo

- Location within Poland
- Coordinates: 54°23′14″N 18°21′22″E
- Country: Poland
- Voivodeship: Pomeranian
- County: Kartuzy
- Gmina: Żukowo

Population
  - Total: 290
- Time zone: UTC+1 (CET)
  - Summer (DST): UTC+2 (CEST)
- Vehicle registration: GKA

Miszewo [miˈʂɛvɔ] is a village in the administrative district of Gmina Żukowo, within Kartuzy County, Pomeranian Voivodeship, in northern Poland. It is located in the ethnocultural region of Kashubia in the historical region of Pomerania.

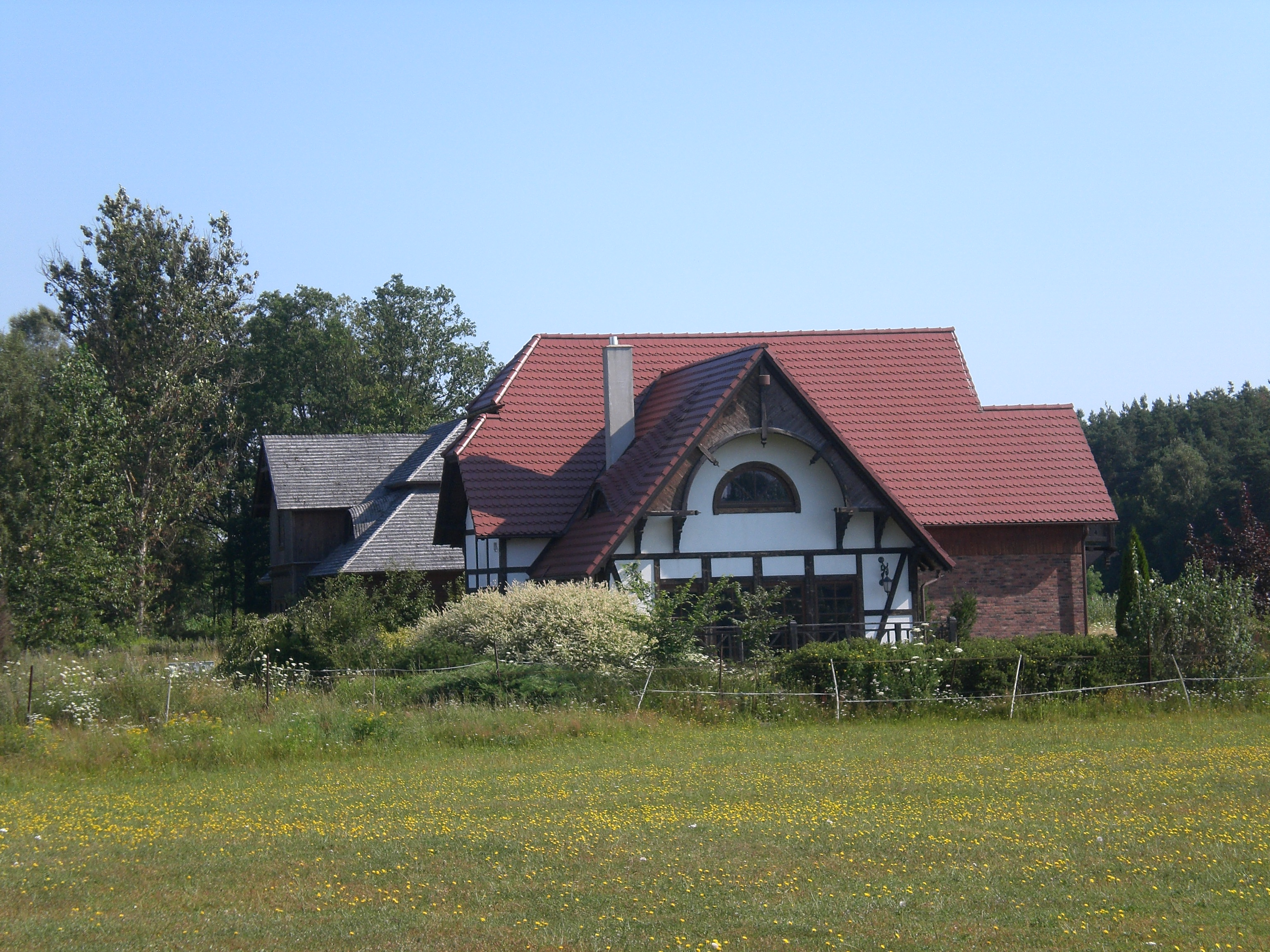
House in Miszewo

== History ==
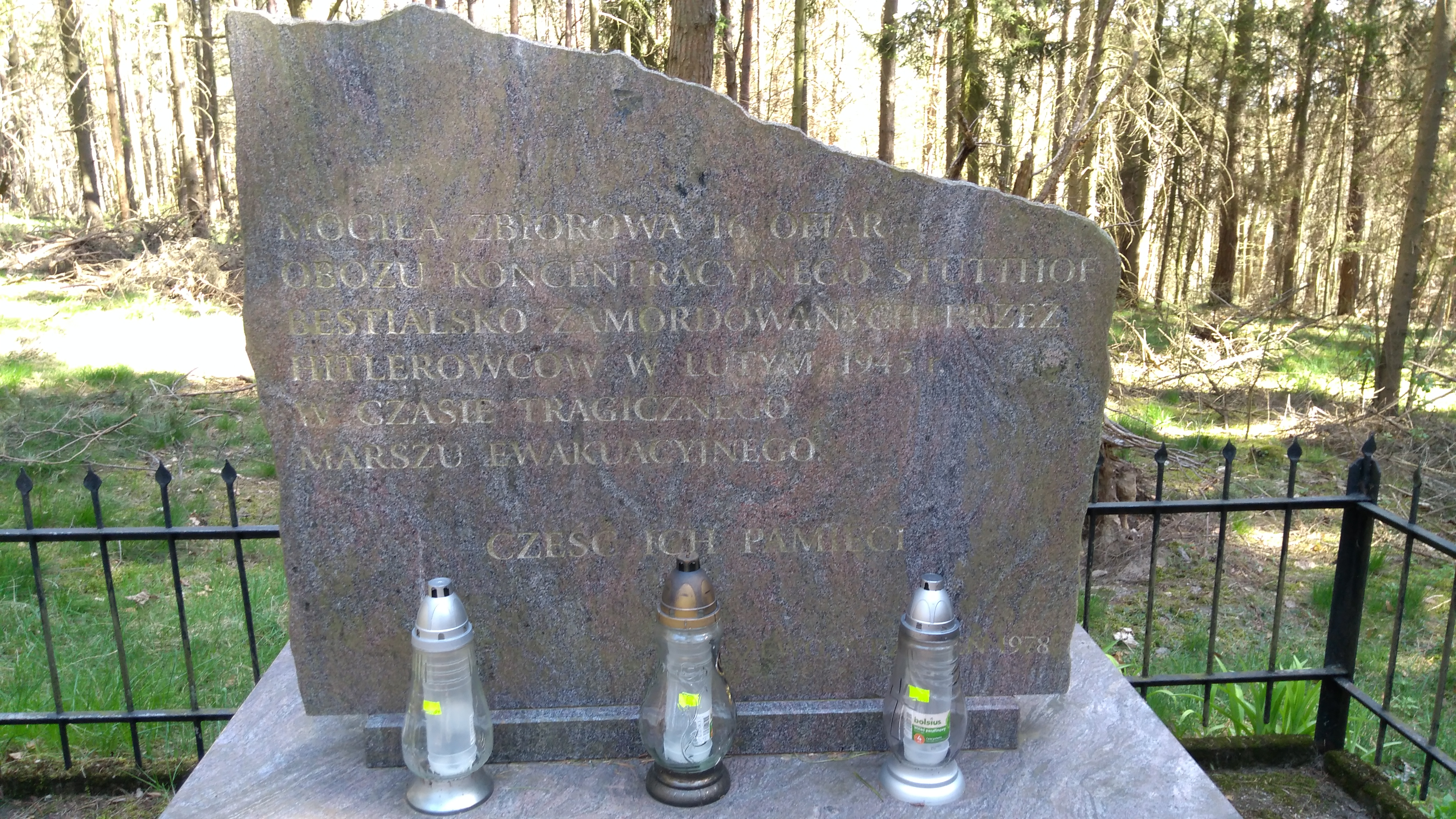
Memorial located at a mass grave of 16 of the victims of the Stutthof concentration camp

It was a private village of Polish nobility, including the Miszewski and Jackowski families, administratively located in the Gdańsk County in the Pomeranian Voivodeship of the Kingdom of Poland.
