= Banino =

- Village
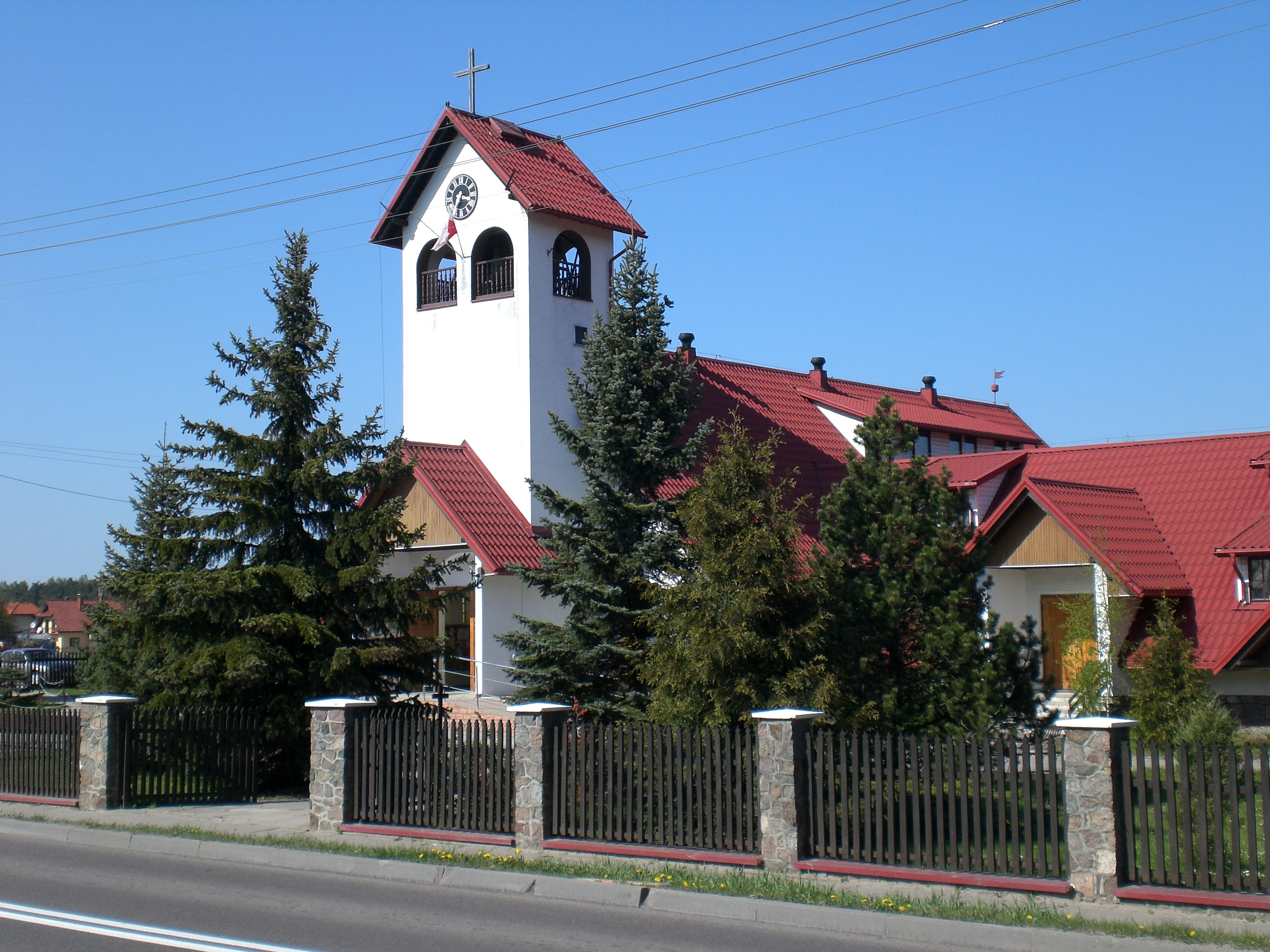
- Church of the Immaculate Conception

- Location within Poland
- Coordinates: 54°23′36″N 18°24′30″E
- Country: Poland
- Voivodeship: Pomeranian
- County: Kartuzy
- Gmina: Żukowo
- Population: 9,835

Banino [baˈninɔ] is a village in the administrative district of Gmina Żukowo, within Kartuzy County, Pomeranian Voivodeship, in northern Poland.

== History ==
=== Medieval period ===
The village of Banino, located in the Pomorskie region, boasts a deeply rooted history dating back to 1283, when the first mentions of it appeared in documents. The name "Banino" originates from the word "bania", originally meaning a pit or mine, reflecting the rich mining heritage of this region. The mining value was an integral part of Banino's history, referring to the extraction of ores and gravel from these areas.

In the Middle Ages, in 1283, Duke Mestwin II of Gdańsk-Pomerania handed over the lands of Banino to the Cistercian monastery in Oliwa. At that time, the village was a peasant settlement, and its inhabitants lived under Polish law, which was an exception among the possessions of the Oliwa convent. The Cistercians soon established a church here dedicated to St. Michael, which vanished under unknown circumstances, leaving visible remains until the 17th century.

=== 18th century ===
The development of Banino was not without setbacks. In the 18th century, the village was also known as Banin or Bullenbrock, reflecting the changing nomenclature of that period. In 1717, the village was leased to Brandt, who was obligated to build a new church. Despite the plans, the realization of this goal did not come to fruition, and Banino's Catholics remained connected to the parish in Matarnia.

=== 20th century ===
The post-World War II era posed both challenges and opportunities for development. The Banino community actively engaged in the process of rebuilding and modernization, establishing new institutions such as a Health Center, the "Ruch" Press and Book Club, and a Post Office. Local organizations, such as the Rural Youth Association and the Women's Circle, contributed to active community life and supported various initiatives.

Political and administrative changes, such as the establishment of the Żukowo Commune and the reorganization of territorial authorities, influenced life in Banino. The village's community mirrored the changes occurring throughout the country, engaging in development and shaping the future.

== Population and location ==
Banino is a village within the Żukowo Commune. As one of the eighteen administrative units in the commune, Banino covers an area of 779.91 hectares out of the total 15,927 hectares of the Żukowo Commune. The community is home to 942 residents, as of May 22, 2000, contributing to the overall population of 20,206 within the commune.

Situated along the eastern border of the Kartuzy County, Banino is close to the Strzelniczka River, which shapes the village's eastern boundary. To the north lies Borowiec. Banino stands just a short distance from the Tricity area and its modern infrastructure. A network of transportation options, including the ZKM buses connecting Gdańsk, Wrzeszcz, and Banino, as well as PKS buses linking Kartuzy, Gdańsk, and Wrzeszcz, ensure convenient travel. The village is alsolocated near the PKP railway line connecting Gdynia and Kościerzyna, and the International Airport in Rębiechowo is a mere 6 kilometers away.

== Recent development ==
Over the past years, significant developments have taken place, such as the establishment of large factories including "ALGIDA", "ELJOT", and "Eko - finpol", along with various small artisanal workshops specializing in metalwork, construction, carpentry, and more. Within the village, vital institutions like the Health Center, library, post office, and fire station cater to the residents' needs. For details of the history of the region, see History of Pomerania.
