= Żukowo-Wieś =

- Village
- Location within Poland
- Coordinates: 54°21′26″N 18°20′35″E
- Country: Poland
- Voivodeship: Pomeranian
- County: Kartuzy
- Gmina: Żukowo

Żukowo-Wieś [ʐuˈkɔvɔ ˈvjɛɕ] is a village in the administrative district of Gmina Żukowo, within Kartuzy County, Pomeranian Voivodeship, in northern Poland.

For details of the history of the region, see History of Pomerania.
