= Stara Piła railway station =

Railway station in Stara Piła, Poland

Coordinates: 54°19′34″N 18°24′37″E

Stara Piła
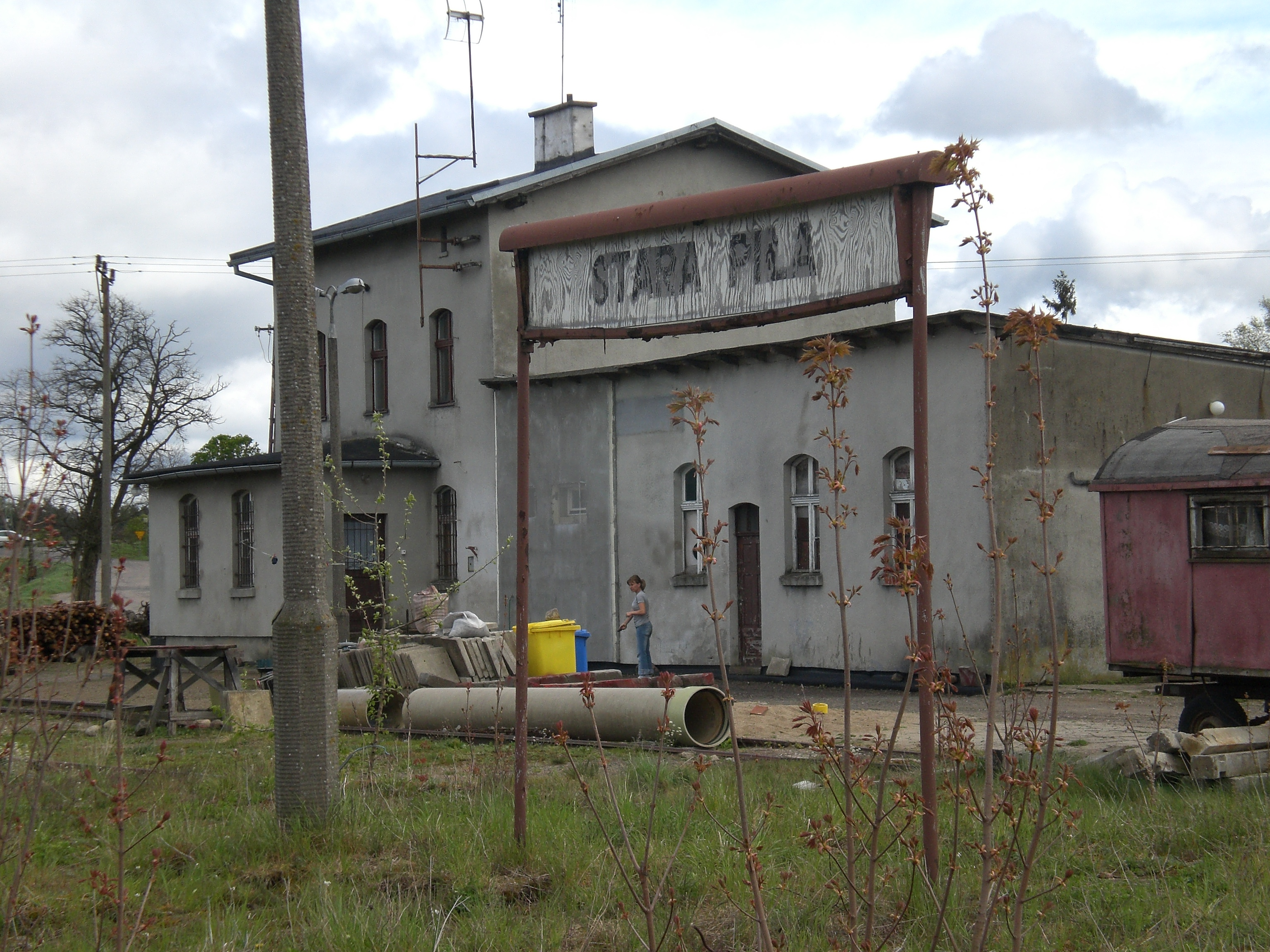
- Former train station in Stara Piła

General information
- Location: Stara Piła; Poland
- Owner: Polskie Koleje Państwowe S.A.
- Platforms: 1

Construction
- Structure type: Building: Yes (no longer used); Depot: No; Water tower: Yes (no longer used)

History
- Opened: 1886
- Former names: Altemühle until 1945
Location

Stara Piła is a PKP railway station in Stara Piła (Pomeranian Voivodeship), Poland.

== Lines crossing the station ==
Start station	End station	Line type
Pruszcz Gdański	Łeba	Freight
Gdańsk Wrzeszcz	Stara Piła	Passenger/Freight
