= Chwaszczyno =

- Village
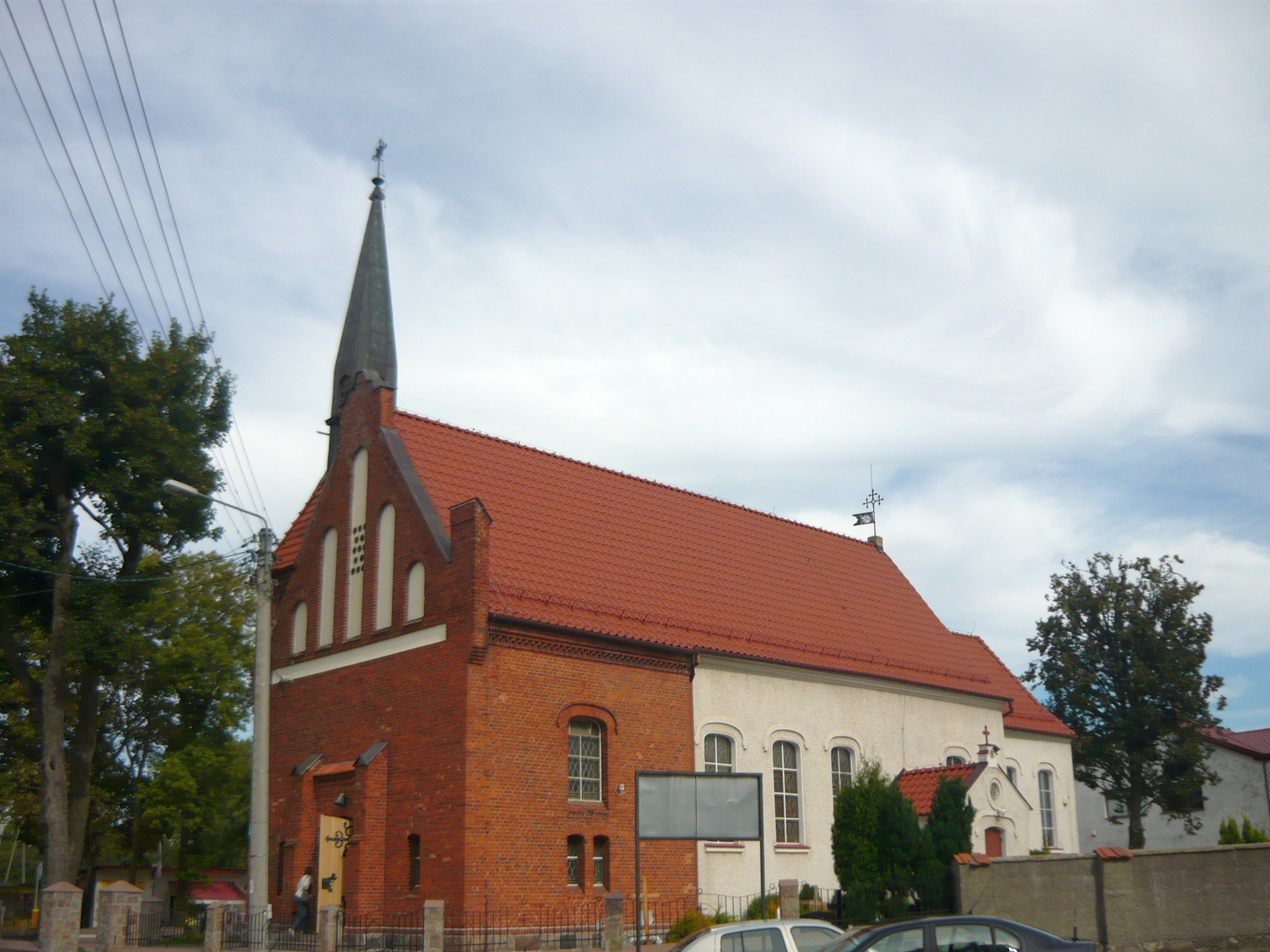
- Church

- Location within Poland
- Coordinates: 54°26′37″N 18°25′9″E
- Country: Poland
- Voivodeship: Pomeranian
- County: Kartuzy
- Gmina: Żukowo
- Population: 3,700 (2,021)
- Website: http://chwaszczyno.com

Chwaszczyno [xfaʂˈt͡ʂɨnɔ] (German: Quaschin) is a village in the administrative district of Gmina Żukowo, within Kartuzy County, Pomeranian Voivodeship, in northern Poland.

For details of the history of the region, see History of Pomerania.
