= Tuchom =

- Village
- Location within Poland
- Coordinates: 54°25′46″N 18°23′25″E
- Country: Poland
- Voivodeship: Pomeranian
- County: Kartuzy
- Gmina: Żukowo
- Population: 1,024

Tuchom [ˈtuxɔm] is a village in the administrative district of Gmina Żukowo, within Kartuzy County, Pomeranian Voivodeship, in northern Poland.

For details of the history of the region, see History of Pomerania.
