= Małkowo =

- Village
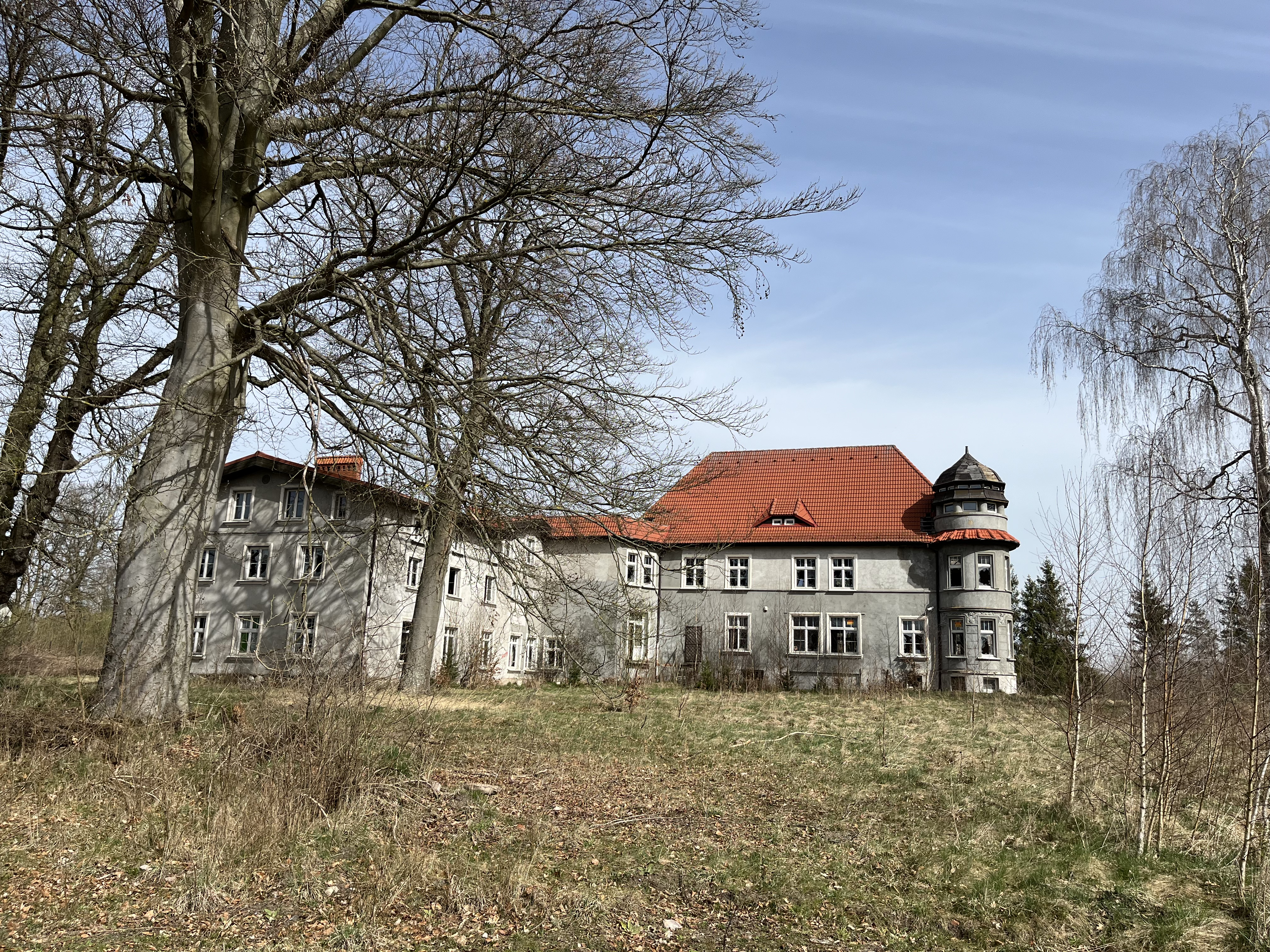
- Manor house in Małkowo

- Location within Poland
- Coordinates: 54°22′11″N 18°20′6″E
- Country: Poland
- Voivodeship: Pomeranian
- County: Kartuzy
- Gmina: Żukowo
- Population: 802

Małkowo ([mau̯ˈkɔvɔ]; Kashubian: Môłkòwò, German: Malkau) is a village in the administrative district of Gmina Żukowo, within Kartuzy County, Pomeranian Voivodeship, in northern Poland.

For details of the history of the region, see History of Pomerania.

== History ==
=== 14th-16th century ===
The history of the village dates back to the 14th century, when in 1339 Dietrich von Altenburg gave the village's lands to Jan in exchange for his services to the Teutonic Order. In 1380, the village lost about 377 hectares as a result of the creation of the new village of Słupno (now Młynek). Over the following years, the village had many owners and gradually more and more of it was owned by the Carthusians. The order owned the entire village in 1437. A sovereign privilege was granted to the village in 1547. A visitation by Hieronim Rozrażewski in 1583 stated that the village was inhabited by 30 people at that time.

=== 17th-19th centuries ===
The wars of the 17th and 18th centuries caused the village to stagnate and become impoverished. In 1693, 18 horse soldiers were quartered in the village by order of Daniel Meier. Another heavy burden on the village was the need to maintain a group of Polish army stationed in the village in 1701. Due to the deteriorating property situation of the village, the Carthusian monastery to which the village belonged was forced to pledge the village in 1701 to Kazimierz Czapski, but the order managed to buy back the village 11 years later. Before the Third Northern War, there were 2 richer villargers, while by 1710 only 1 remained. The War of the Polish Succession caused further losses and impoverishment of the village.

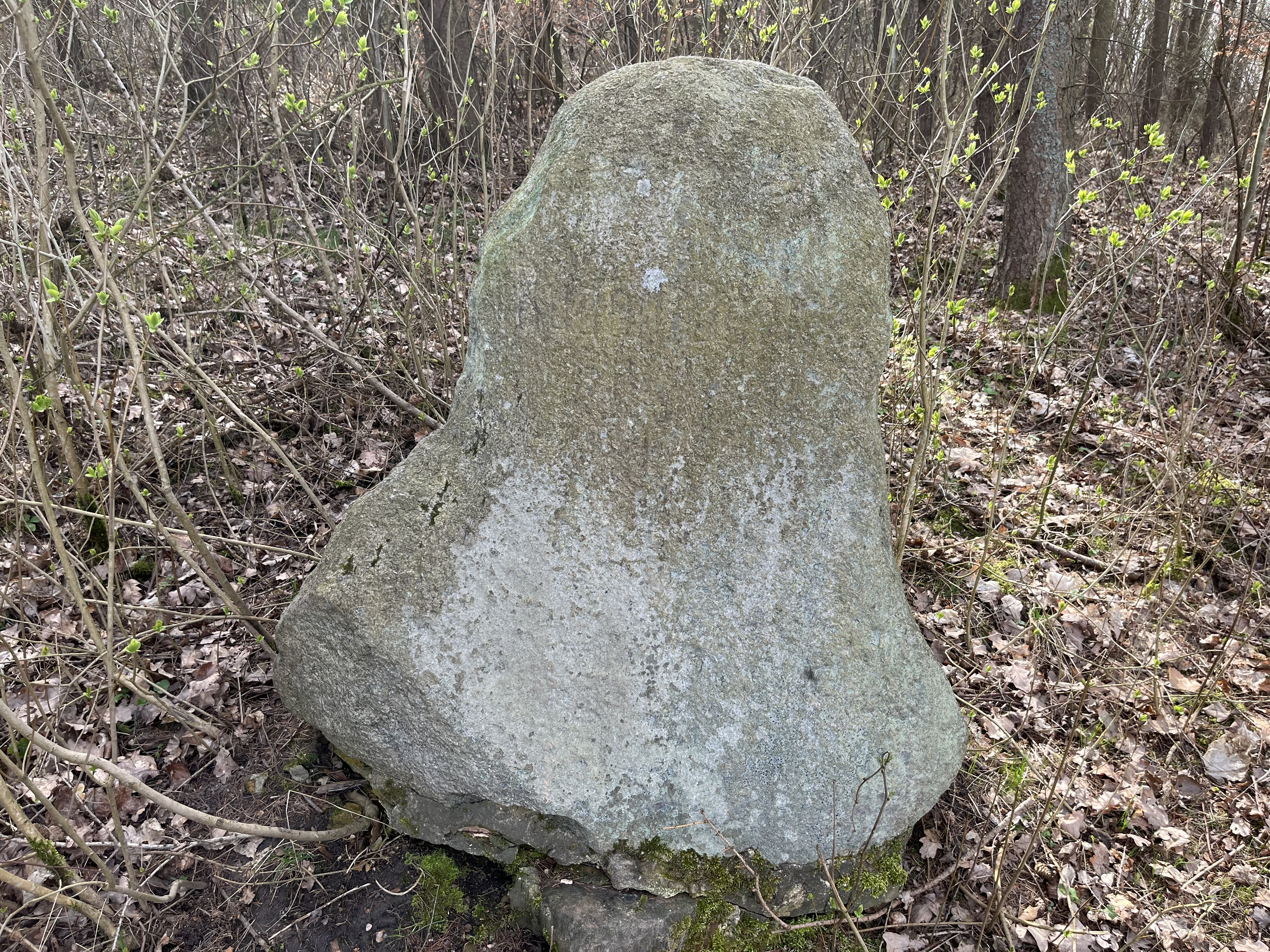
Grave of the Rudolf Boelcke

After the partition of Poland, from 1778 to 1795, the leaseholder of village was Kazimierz Erdman von Brauneck. From then on, the process of rebuilding the village's economic situation and its increasing population began. In 1789 there were 14 houses in the village, already in 1820 the village was inhabited by 120 people. In 1910, Małkowo was inhabited by 169 residents, most of whom were Kashubians.

In a census compiled in 1903-1909, the owner of the village is Max Bölcke. The records also mention a steam distillery existing in the village. A manor house was built in the second half of the 19th century.

=== Contemporary history ===
The last owner of village before the start of World War II was Rudolf Boelcke. His ashes were buried in the village, and a boulder was erected at the burial site with his name and dates of birth and death engraved on it.

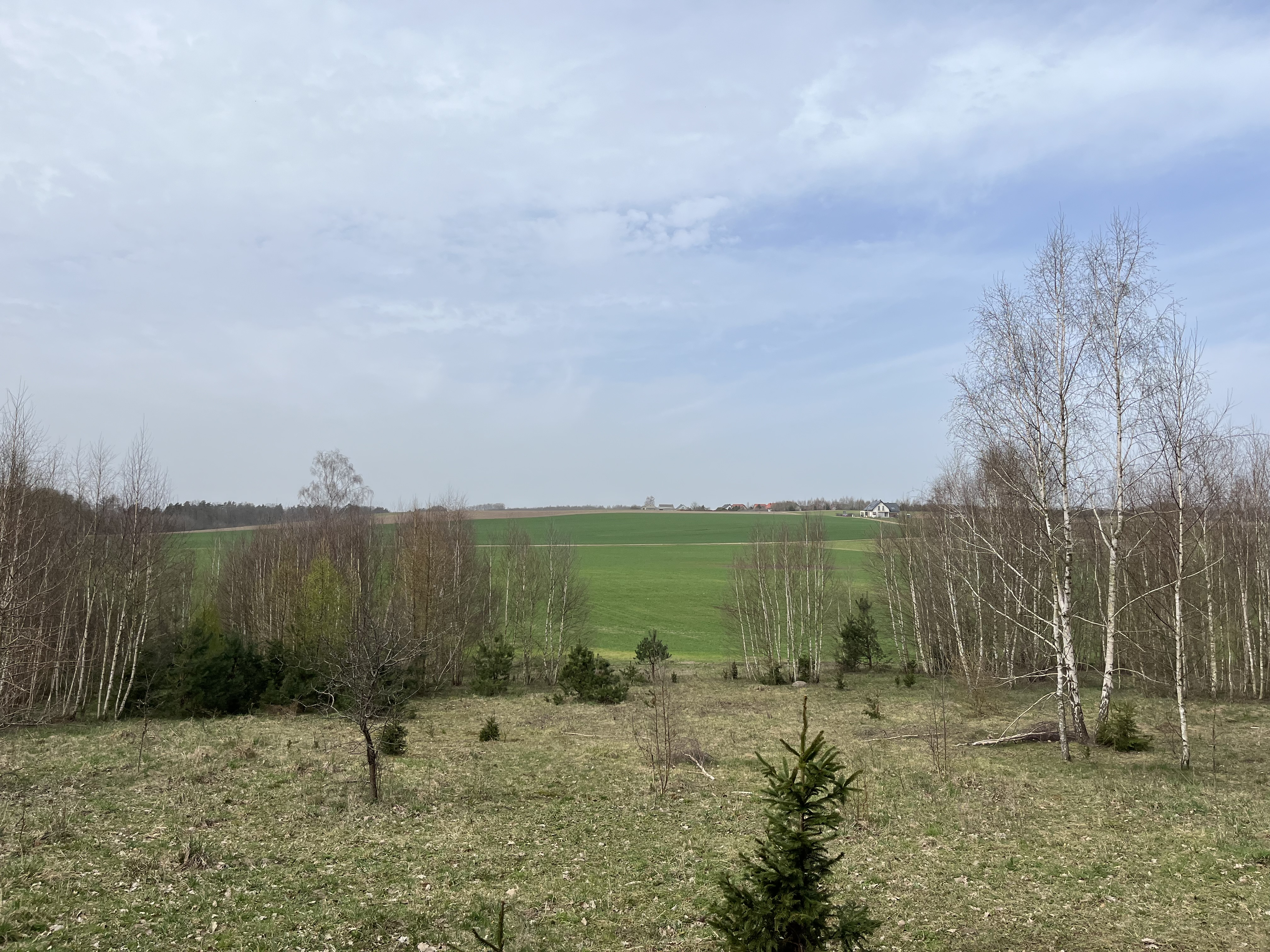
Małkowo during spring season

The village at the end of the war was on the route of the Death March from the Stutthof concentration camp. During the fighting during the East Pomeranian offensive, many German and Soviet soldiers died in the vicinity of the village who were buried in mass graves; these bodies were exhumed after the cessation of hostilities and buried in the war cemetery in Żukowo. In one of the houses that no longer exists, the Russians created a small hospital for wounded soldiers.
