= Gmina Żukowo =

Gmina Żukowo Gmina Żukòwò Żukowo Commune
- Gmina
- Coat of arms
- Interactive map of Gmina Żukowo; Gmina Żukòwò
- Coordinates (Żukowo): 54°20′45″N 18°21′38″E
- Country: Poland
- Voivodeship: Pomeranian
- County: Kartuzy
- Seat: Żukowo

Government
  - Mayor: Wojciech Kankowski

Area
  - Total: 163.95 km^{2} (63.30 sq mi)

Population (2021)
  - Total: 41,743
  - Density: 254.61/km^{2} (659.43/sq mi)
  - Urban: 8,135
  - Rural: 33,608
- Website: https://www.zukowo.pl

Gmina Żukowo (Kashubian: Gmina Żukòwò) is an urban-rural gmina (administrative district) in Kartuzy County, Pomeranian Voivodeship, in northern Poland. Its seat is the town of Żukowo, which lies approximately 11 kilometres (7 mi) east of Kartuzy and 18 km (11 mi) west of the regional capital Gdańsk.

The gmina covers an area of 163.95 square kilometres (63.3 sq mi), and as of 2006 its total population is 41,743 (out of which the population of Żukowo amounts to 8,135, and the population of the rural part of the gmina is 33,608).

== Villages ==
Apart from the town of Żukowo, Gmina Żukowo contains the villages and settlements of Babi Dół, Banino, Barniewice, Borkowo, Borowiec, Chwaszczyno, Czaple, Elżbietowo, Glincz, Łapino Kartuskie, Leźno, Lniska, Małkowo, Miszewko, Miszewo, Niestępowo, Nowy Świat, Otomino, Pępowo, Piaski, Przyjaźń, Rębiechowo, Rutki, Skrzeszewo Żukowskie, Stara Piła, Sulmin, Tuchom, Widlino and Żukowo-Wieś.

== Neighbouring gminas ==
Gmina Żukowo is bordered by the towns of Gdańsk and Gdynia, and by the gminas of Kartuzy, Kolbudy, Przodkowo, Przywidz, Somonino and Szemud.
