= Żukowo railway station =

Railway station in Żukowo, Poland

Coordinates: 54.3444°N 18.3620°E

Żukowo

General information
- Location: Żukowo, Pomeranian Voivodeship; Poland
- System: Railway Station
- Operator: SKM Tricity
- Line: 201: Nowa Wieś Wielka–Gdynia Port railway
- Platforms: 1
- Tracks: 1

History
- Opened: 1 October 2015; 10 years ago
Location
- Location within Poland

Żukowo railway station is a railway station serving the town of Żukowo, in the Pomeranian Voivodeship, Poland. The station opened in on 1 October 2015 and is located on the Nowa Wieś Wielka–Gdynia Port railway. The train services are operated by SKM Tricity. Construction of the station was completed in 2014.

== Train services ==
The station is served by the following services:

- Pomorska Kolej Metropolitalna services (R) Kartuzy — Gdańsk Port Lotniczy (Airport) — Gdańsk Główny
- Pomorska Kolej Metropolitalna services (R) Kościerzyna — Gdańsk Port Lotniczy (Airport) — Gdańsk Wrzeszcz — Gdynia Główna
- Pomorska Kolej Metropolitalna services (R) Kościerzyna — Gdańsk Osowa — Gdynia Główna

Preceding station	Polregio	Following station
Żukowo Wschodnie towards Gdańsk Główny	PR (Via Gdańsk Port Lotniczy (Airport))	Borkowo towards Kartuzy
Borkowo towards Kościerzyna	PR (Via Gdańsk Osowa)	Żukowo Wschodnie towards Gdynia Główna
Borkowo towards Kościerzyna	PR (Via Gdańsk Port Lotniczy (Airport) and Gdańsk Wrzeszcz)	Żukowo Wschodnie towards Gdynia Główna
