= Widlino, Kartuzy County =

Widlino
- Village
- Location within Poland
- Coordinates: 54°18′3″N 18°26′41″E
- Country: Poland
- Voivodeship: Pomeranian
- County: Kartuzy
- Gmina: Żukowo
- Population: 190

Widlino ([viˈdlinɔ]; German: Fidlin) is a village in the administrative district of Gmina Żukowo, within Kartuzy County, Pomeranian Voivodeship, in northern Poland.

For details of the history of the region, see History of Pomerania.
