= Piaski, Pomeranian Voivodeship =

Piaski
- Village
- Location within Poland
- Coordinates: 54°18′09″N 18°20′15″E
- Country: Poland
- Voivodeship: Pomeranian
- County: Kartuzy
- Gmina: Żukowo
- Time zone: UTC+1 (CET)
  - Summer (DST): UTC+2 (CEST)
- Postal code: 83-331
- Vehicle registration: GKA

Piaski (Polish pronunciation: [ˈpjaskʲi]) is a village in the administrative district of Gmina Żukowo, within Kartuzy County, Pomeranian Voivodeship, in northern Poland.
