= Żukowo Wschodnie railway station =

Railway station in Żukowo, Poland

Żukowo Wschodnie
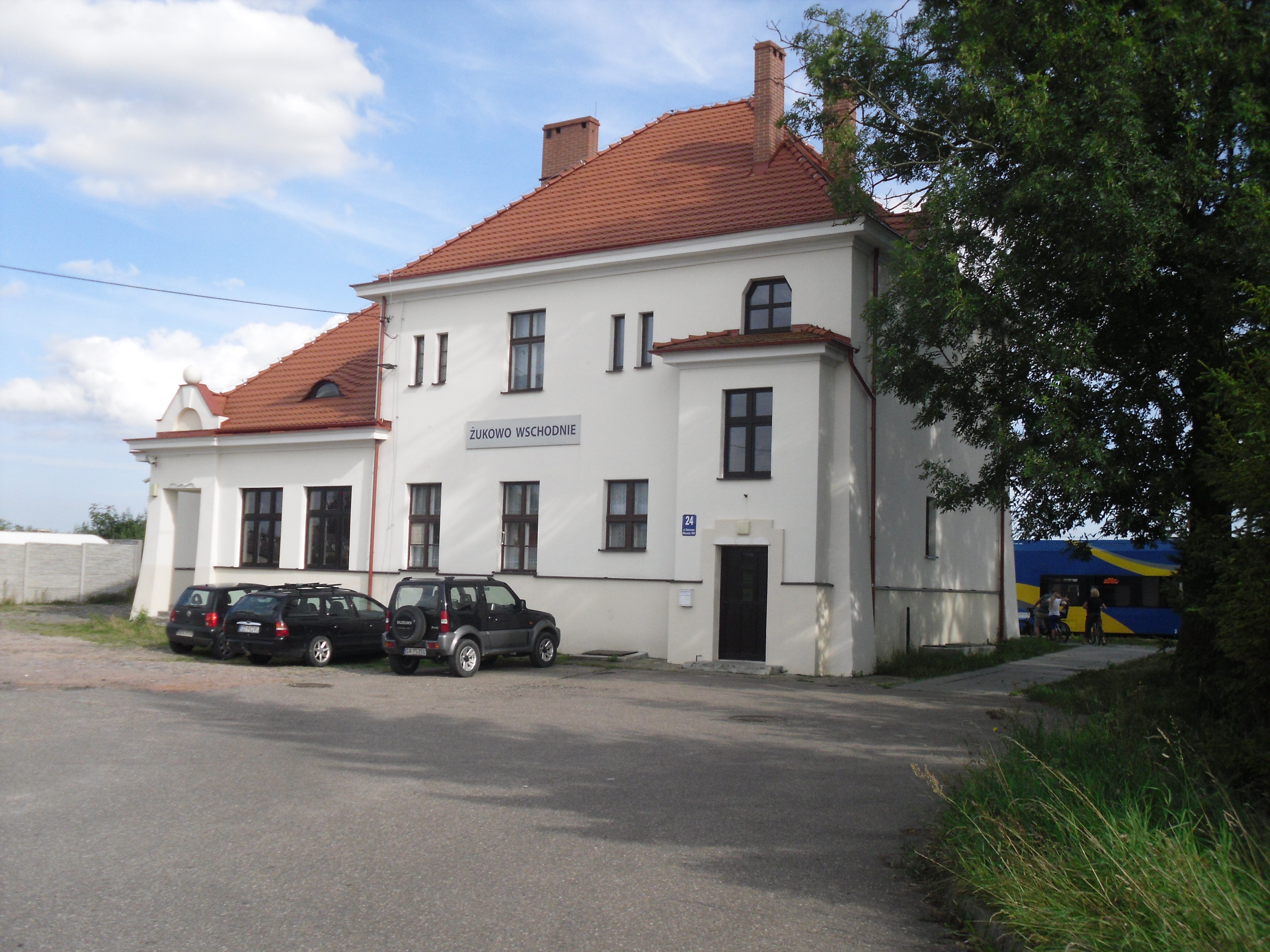
- Żukowo Wschodnie railway station

General information
- Location: Żukowo, Pomeranian Voivodeship; Poland
- System: Railway Station
- Operator: PKP Polskie Linie Kolejowe
- Line: 201: Nowa Wieś Wielka–Gdynia Port railway
- Platforms: 2
- Tracks: 2

History
- Opened: 22 May 1932; 94 years ago
Location
- Location within Poland

Żukowo Wschodnie railway station is a railway station serving the town of Żukowo, in the Pomeranian Voivodeship, Poland. The station opened in 1932 and is located on the Nowa Wieś Wielka–Gdynia Port railway. The train services are operated by SKM Tricity.

== Train services ==
The station is served by the following services:

- Pomorska Kolej Metropolitalna services (R) Kartuzy — Gdańsk Port Lotniczy (Airport) — Gdańsk Główny
- Pomorska Kolej Metropolitalna services (R) Kościerzyna — Gdańsk Port Lotniczy (Airport) — Gdańsk Wrzeszcz — Gdynia Główna
- Pomorska Kolej Metropolitalna services (R) Kościerzyna — Gdańsk Osowa — Gdynia Główna

Preceding station	Polregio	Following station
Gdańsk Port Lotniczy (Airport) towards Gdańsk Główny	PR (Via Gdańsk Port Lotniczy (Airport))	Żukowo towards Kartuzy
Żukowo towards Kościerzyna	PR (Via Gdańsk Osowa)	Pępowo Kartuskie towards Gdynia Główna
Żukowo towards Kościerzyna	PR (Via Gdańsk Port Lotniczy (Airport) and Gdańsk Wrzeszcz)	Pępowo Kartuskie towards Gdynia Główna

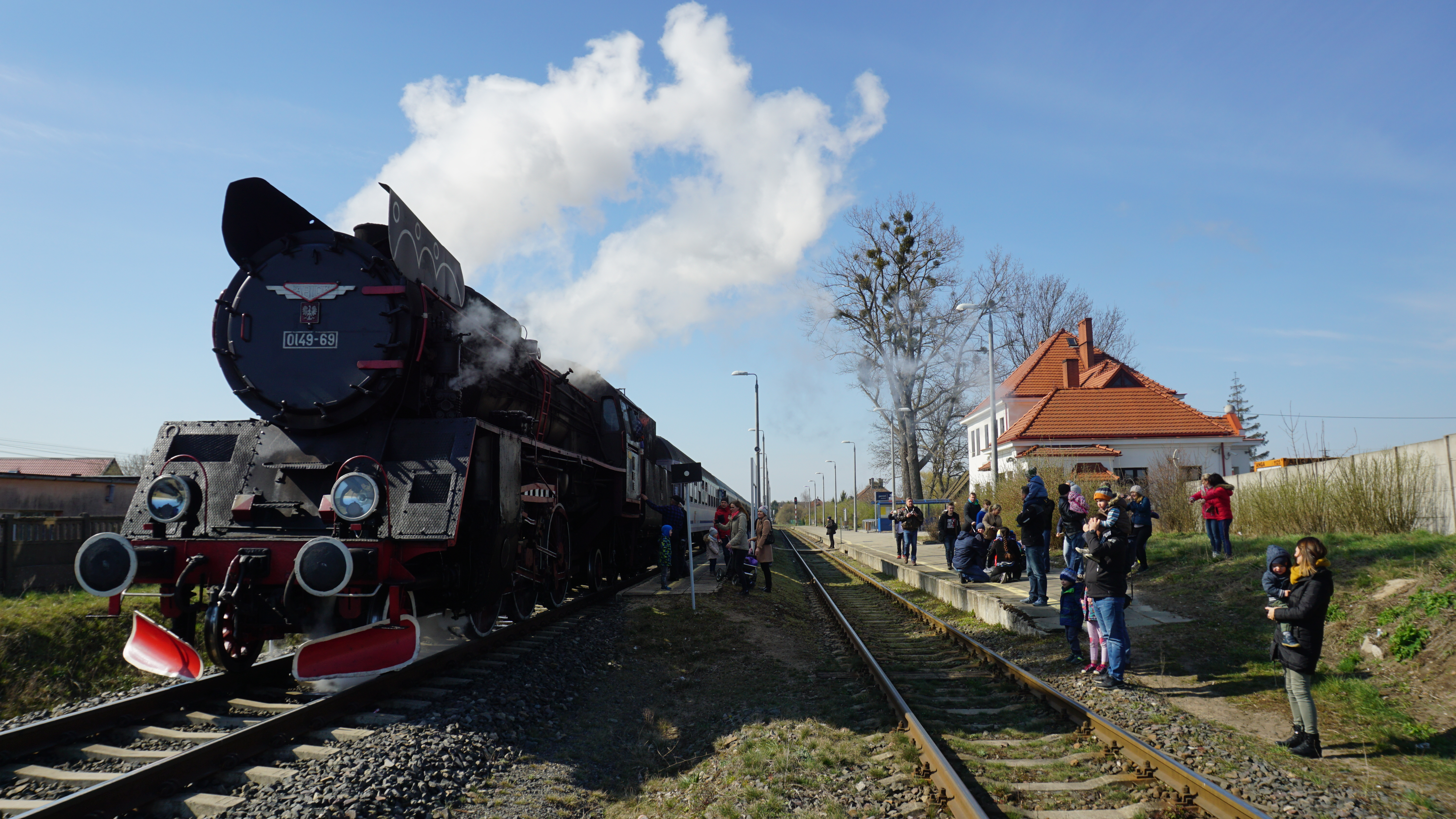
Vintage Fablok Ol49-69 at the Żukowo Wschodnie railway station, 2019
