= Nowy Świat, Pomeranian Voivodeship =

Nowy Świat
- Settlement
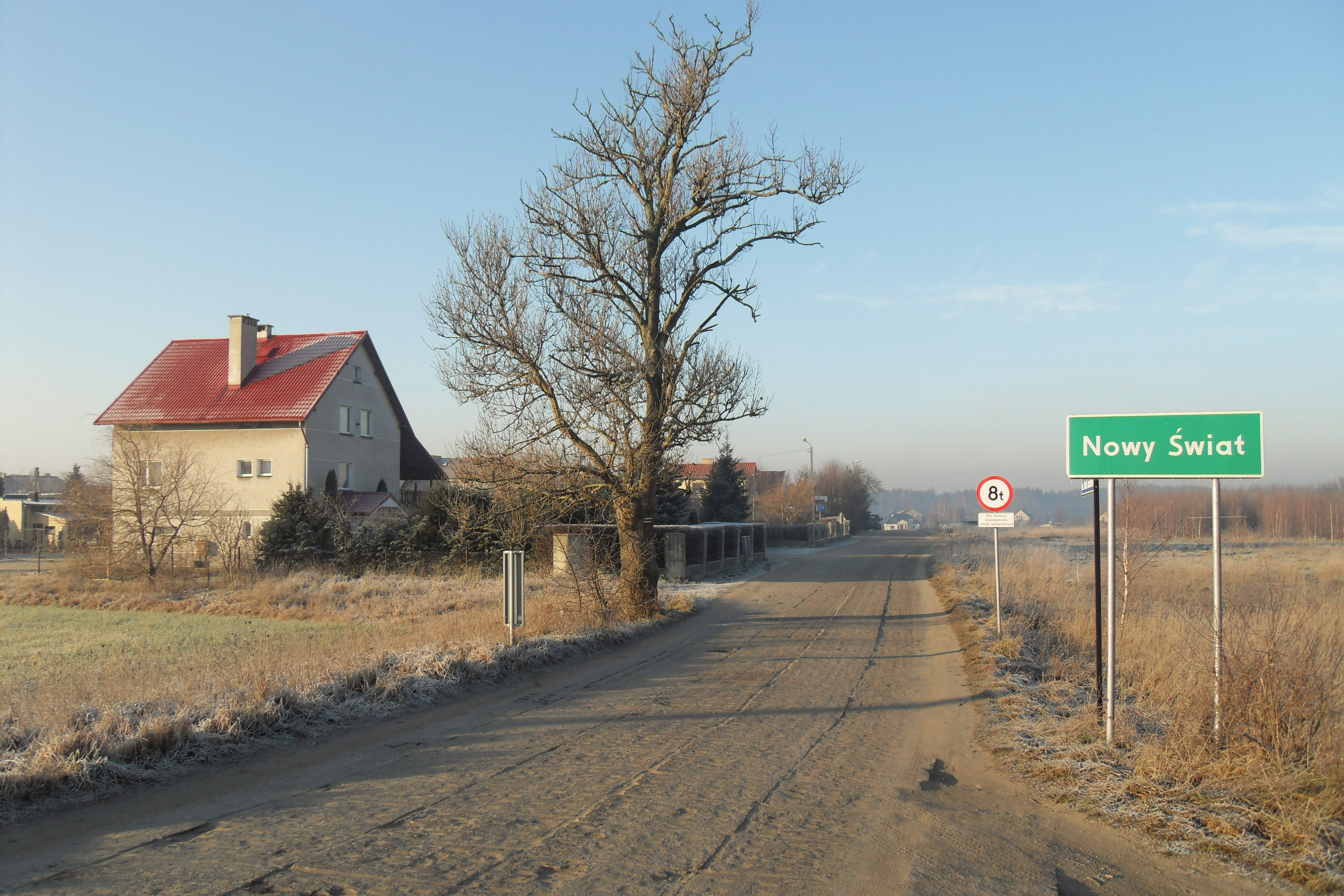
- Nowy Świat

- Location within Poland
- Coordinates: 54°24′58″N 18°26′39″E
- Country: Poland
- Voivodeship: Pomeranian
- County: Kartuzy
- Gmina: Żukowo

Population
  - Total: 206

Nowy Świat (Polish: [ˈnɔvɨ ˈɕfjat]) is a settlement in the administrative district of Gmina Żukowo, within Kartuzy County, Pomeranian Voivodeship, in northern Poland.

For details of the history of the region, see History of Pomerania.
