= Przyjaźń, Pomeranian Voivodeship =

Przyjaźń
- Village
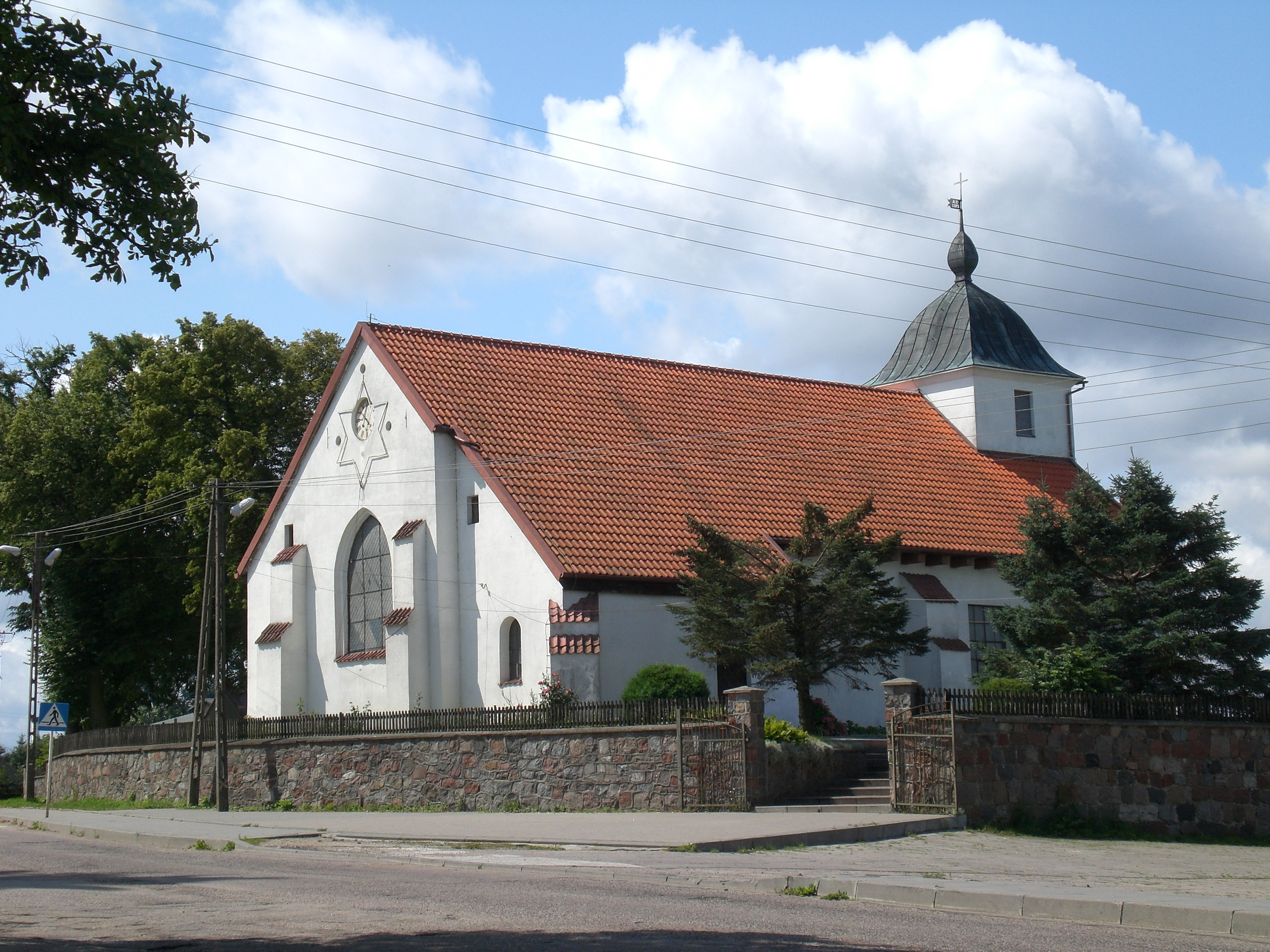

- Location within Poland
- Coordinates: 54°18′37″N 18°23′29″E
- Country: Poland
- Voivodeship: Pomeranian
- County: Kartuzy
- Gmina: Żukowo
- Population: 1,206

Przyjaźń [ˈpʂɨjaʑɲ] is a village in the gmina of Żukowo, within Kartuzy County, Pomeranian Voivodeship, in northern Poland.

For details of the history of the region, see History of Pomerania.
