= Skrzeszewo Żukowskie =

- Village
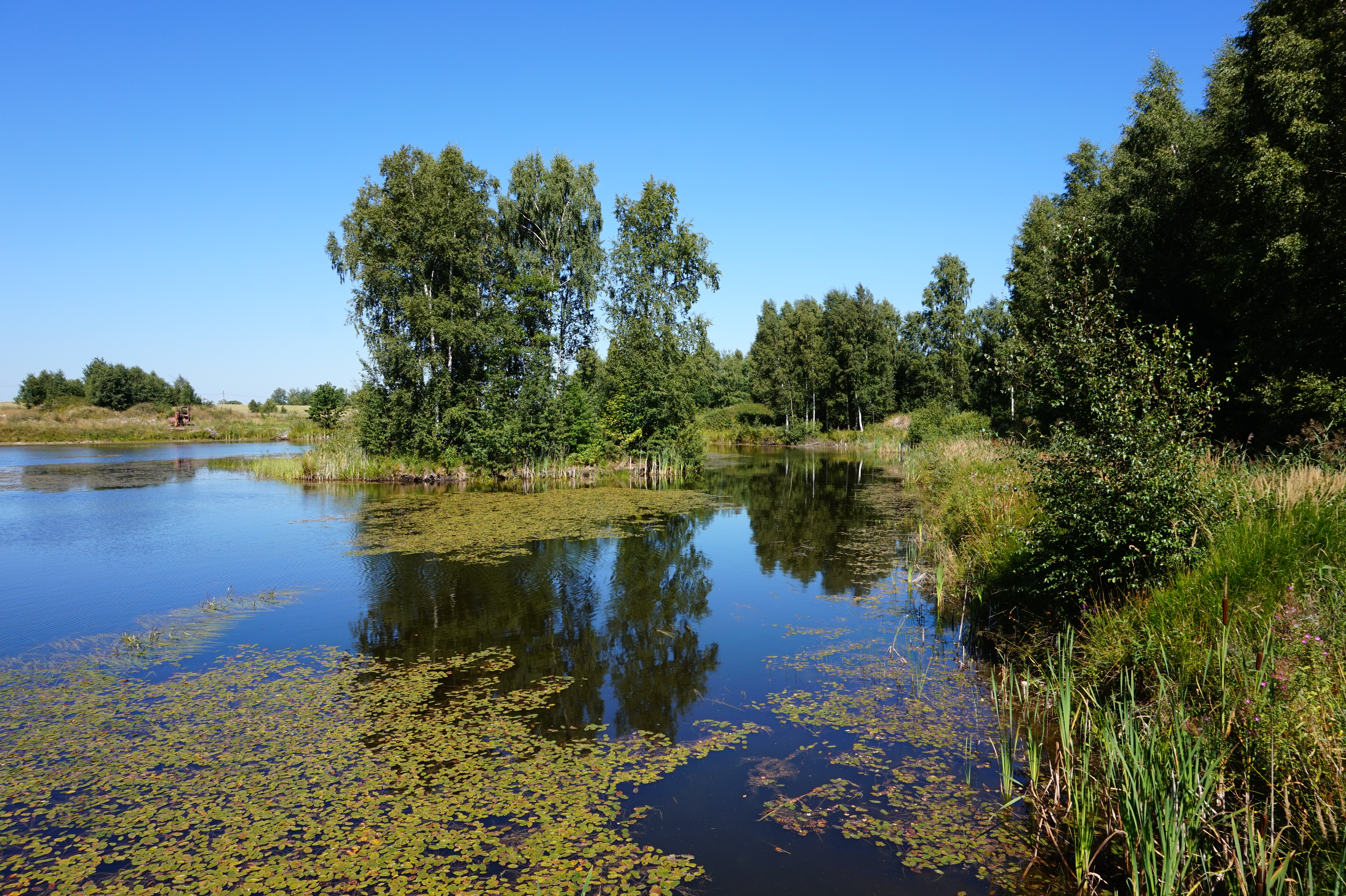

- Location within Poland
- Coordinates: 54°17′6″N 18°21′5″E
- Country: Poland
- Voivodeship: Pomeranian
- County: Kartuzy
- Gmina: Żukowo

Population
  - Total: 1,013
- Time zone: UTC+1 (CET)
  - Summer (DST): UTC+2 (CEST)
- Vehicle registration: GKA

Skrzeszewo Żukowskie [skʂɛˈʂɛvɔ ʐuˈkɔfskʲɛ] is a village in the administrative district of Gmina Żukowo, within Kartuzy County, Pomeranian Voivodeship, in northern Poland. It is located in the ethnocultural region of Kashubia in the historical region of Pomerania.

== History ==
Skrzeszewo was a private village of Polish nobility, including the Skrzeszewski family, administratively located in the Gdańsk County in the Pomeranian Voivodeship of the Kingdom of Poland.
