= Rutki, Pomeranian Voivodeship =

Rutki
- Village
- Location within Poland
- Coordinates: 54°19′52″N 18°20′20″E
- Country: Poland
- Voivodeship: Pomeranian
- County: Kartuzy
- Gmina: Żukowo
- Population: 221

Rutki [ˈrutki] is a village in the administrative district of Gmina Żukowo, within Kartuzy County, Pomeranian Voivodeship, in northern Poland.

For details of the history of the region, see History of Pomerania.
