= Barniewice, Kartuzy County =

Barniewice
- Village
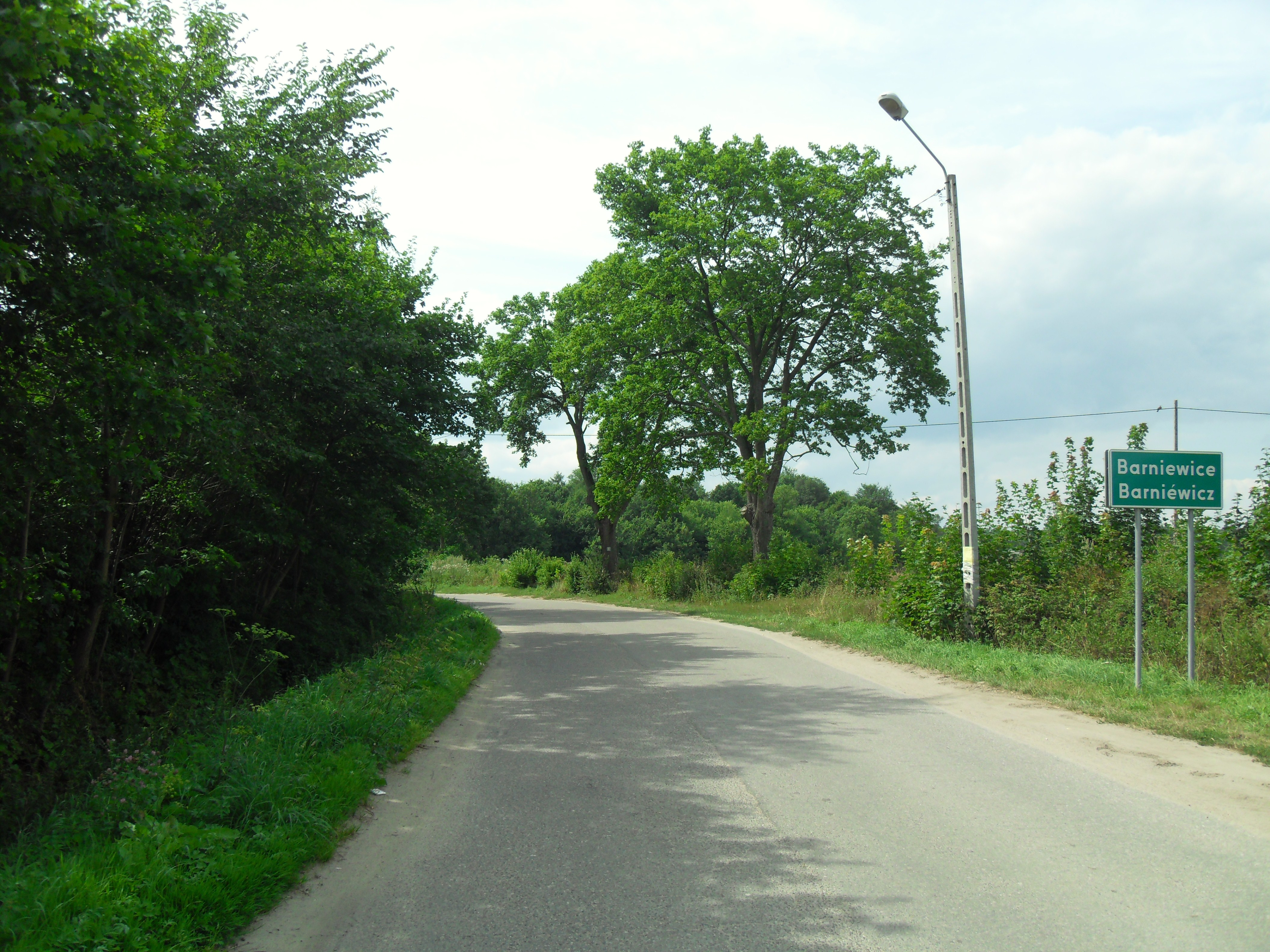

- Location within Poland
- Coordinates: 54°24′14″N 18°26′12″E
- Country: Poland
- Voivodeship: Pomeranian
- County: Kartuzy
- Gmina: Żukowo
- Population: 315

Barniewice [barɲɛˈvit͡sɛ] is a village in the administrative district of Gmina Żukowo, within Kartuzy County, Pomeranian Voivodeship, in northern Poland.

For details of the history of the region, see History of Pomerania.
