= Glincz =

- Village
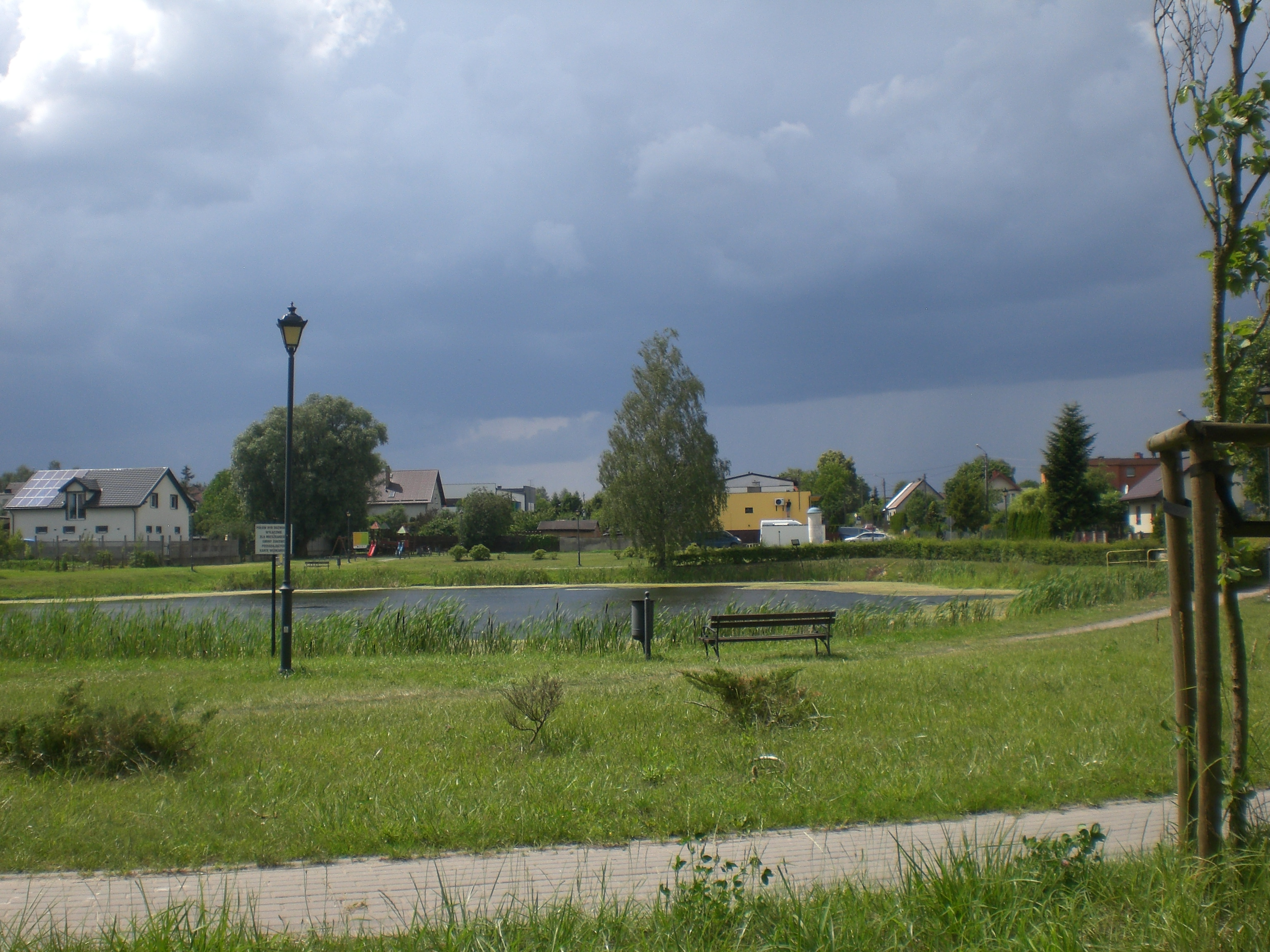

- Location within Poland
- Coordinates: 54°19′19″N 18°20′46″E
- Country: Poland
- Voivodeship: Pomeranian
- County: Kartuzy
- Gmina: Żukowo

Population
  - Total: 690
- Time zone: UTC+1 (CET)
  - Summer (DST): UTC+2 (CEST)
- Vehicle registration: GKA

Glincz [ɡlint͡ʂ] is a village in the administrative district of Gmina Żukowo, within Kartuzy County, Pomeranian Voivodeship, in northern Poland. It is located in the ethnocultural region of Kashubia in the historical region of Pomerania.

== History ==
Glincz Nowy was a private village of Polish nobility, including the Gliński, Borkowski and Witek families, administratively located in the Gdańsk County in the Pomeranian Voivodeship of the Kingdom of Poland.
