= Stara Piła =

- Settlement
- Location within Poland
- Coordinates: 54°19′39″N 18°24′58″E
- Country: Poland
- Voivodeship: Pomeranian
- County: Kartuzy
- Gmina: Żukowo

Stara Piła [ˈstara ˈpiwa] is a settlement in the administrative district of Gmina Żukowo, within Kartuzy County, Pomeranian Voivodeship, in northern Poland.

For details of the history of the region, see History of Pomerania.
