= Rębiechowo, Kartuzy County =

Rębiechowo
- Village
- Location within Poland
- Coordinates: 54°24′N 18°26′E
- Country: Poland
- Voivodeship: Pomeranian
- County: Kartuzy
- Gmina: Żukowo
- Population: 463

Rębiechowo [rɛmbjɛˈxɔvɔ] is a village in the administrative district of Gmina Żukowo, within Kartuzy County, Pomeranian Voivodeship, in northern Poland.

In 1973, the eastern part of the village was incorporated into the city of Gdańsk, where it now forms a district known as Rębiechowo. This is the location of Gdańsk Lech Wałęsa Airport, which was formerly called Gdańsk-Rębiechowo (and continues to be referred to informally by that name).
