= Pępowo, Pomeranian Voivodeship =

Pępowo
- Village
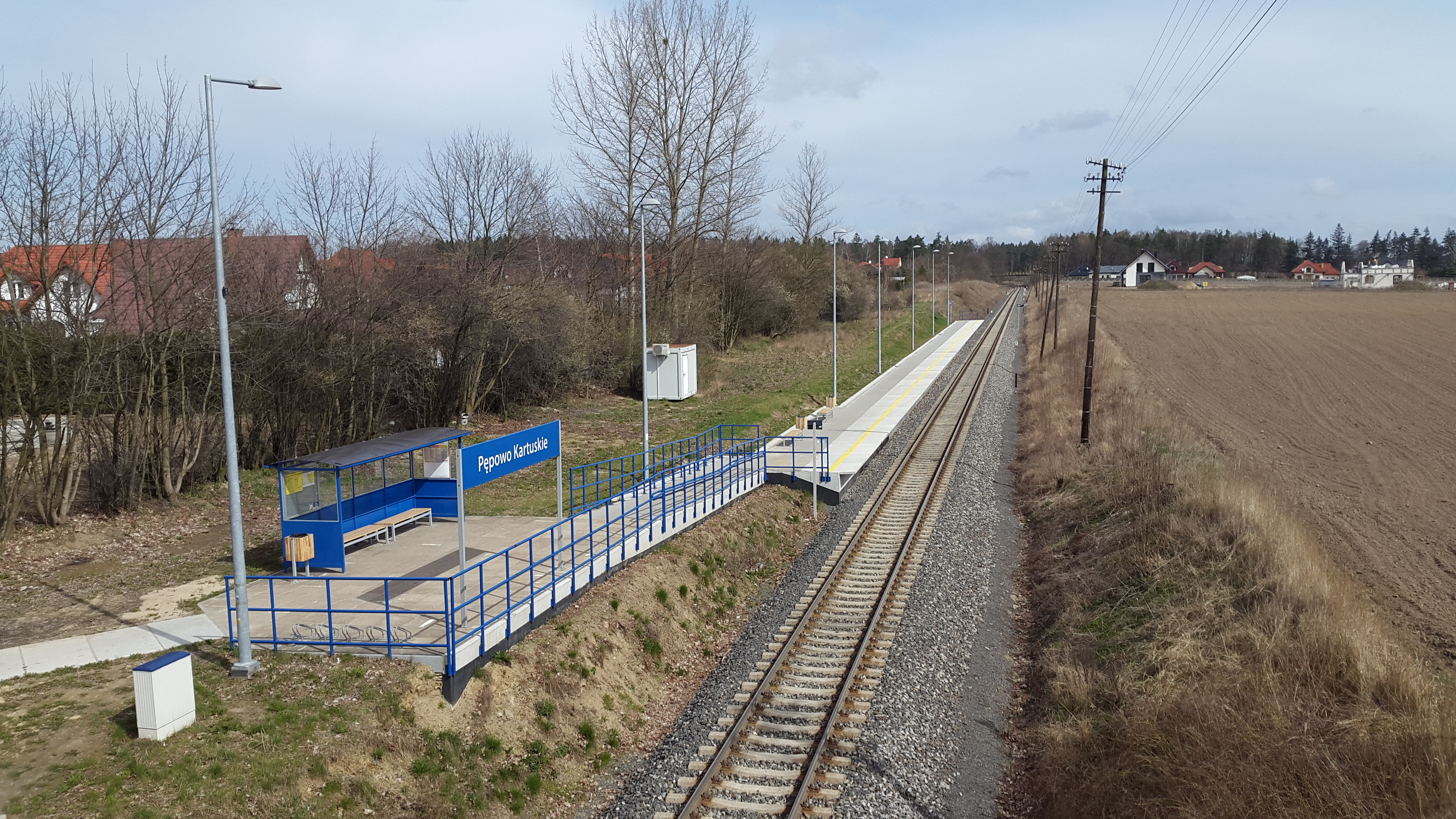
- Railway station in Pępowo

- Location within Poland
- Coordinates: 54°22′5″N 18°23′41″E
- Country: Poland
- Voivodeship: Pomeranian
- County: Kartuzy
- Gmina: Żukowo

Population
  - Total: 1,469 (2,011)
- Time zone: UTC+1 (CET)
  - Summer (DST): UTC+2 (CEST)
- Vehicle registration: GKA

Pępowo [pɛmˈpɔvɔ] is a village in the administrative district of Gmina Żukowo, within Kartuzy County, Pomeranian Voivodeship, in northern Poland. It is located in the ethnocultural region of Kashubia in the historical region of Pomerania.

== History ==
Pępowo was a private village of Polish nobility, including the Pępowski family of Gozdawa coat of arms, administratively located in the Gdańsk County in the Pomeranian Voivodeship of the Kingdom of Poland.
