= Dzierżążno, Kartuzy County =

Dzierżążno
- Village
- Location within Poland
- Coordinates: 54°18′58″N 18°16′2″E
- Country: Poland
- Voivodeship: Pomeranian
- County: Kartuzy
- Gmina: Kartuzy
- Population: 1,314

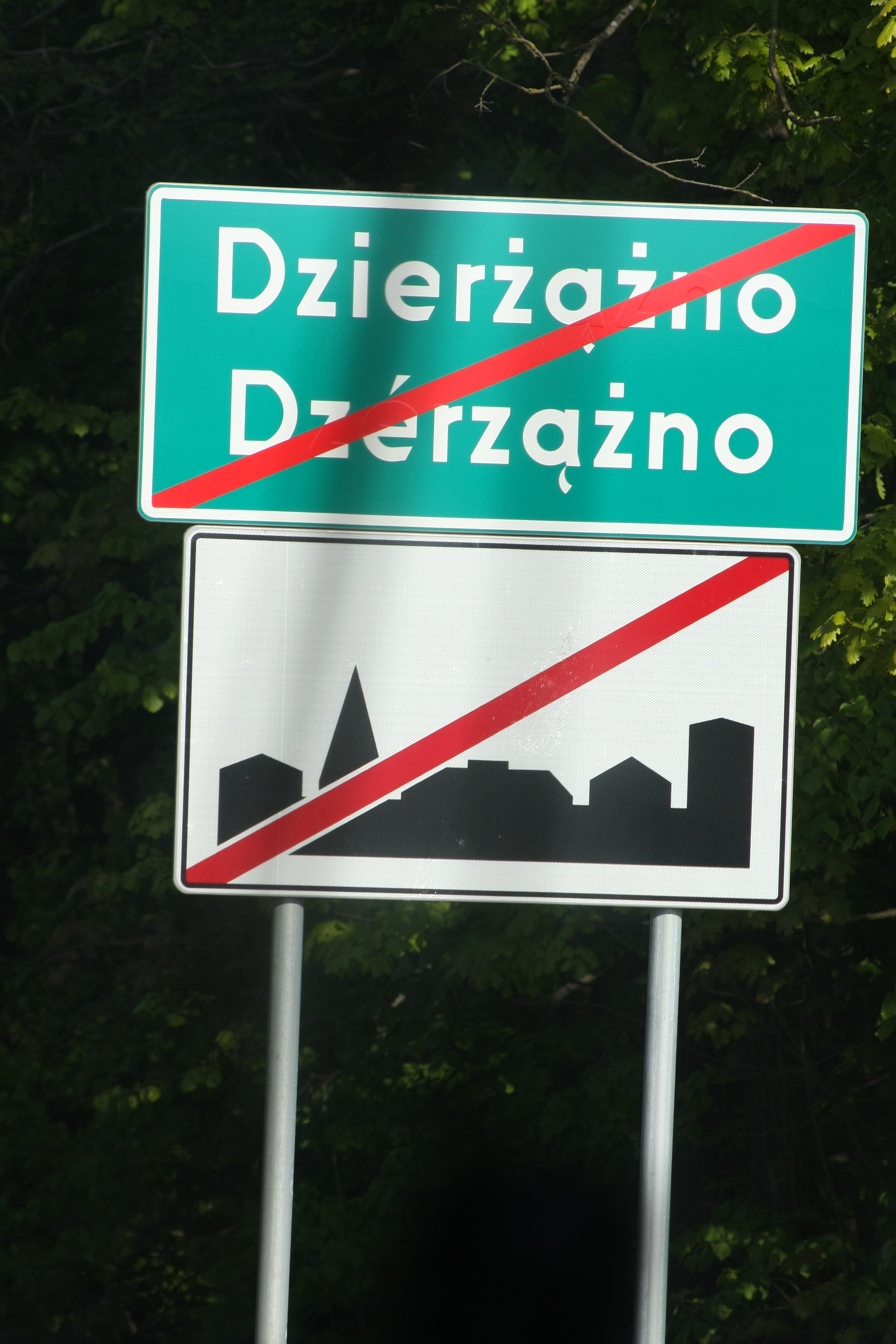
Dzierżążno in Polish and Cashubian

Dzierżążno [d͡ʑɛrˈʐɔ̃ʐnɔ] (Cashubian Dzérzążno) is a village in the administrative district of Gmina Kartuzy, within Kartuzy County, Pomeranian Voivodeship, in northern Poland.

== See also ==
- History of Pomerania
