= Borkowo, Kartuzy County =

Borkowo
- Village
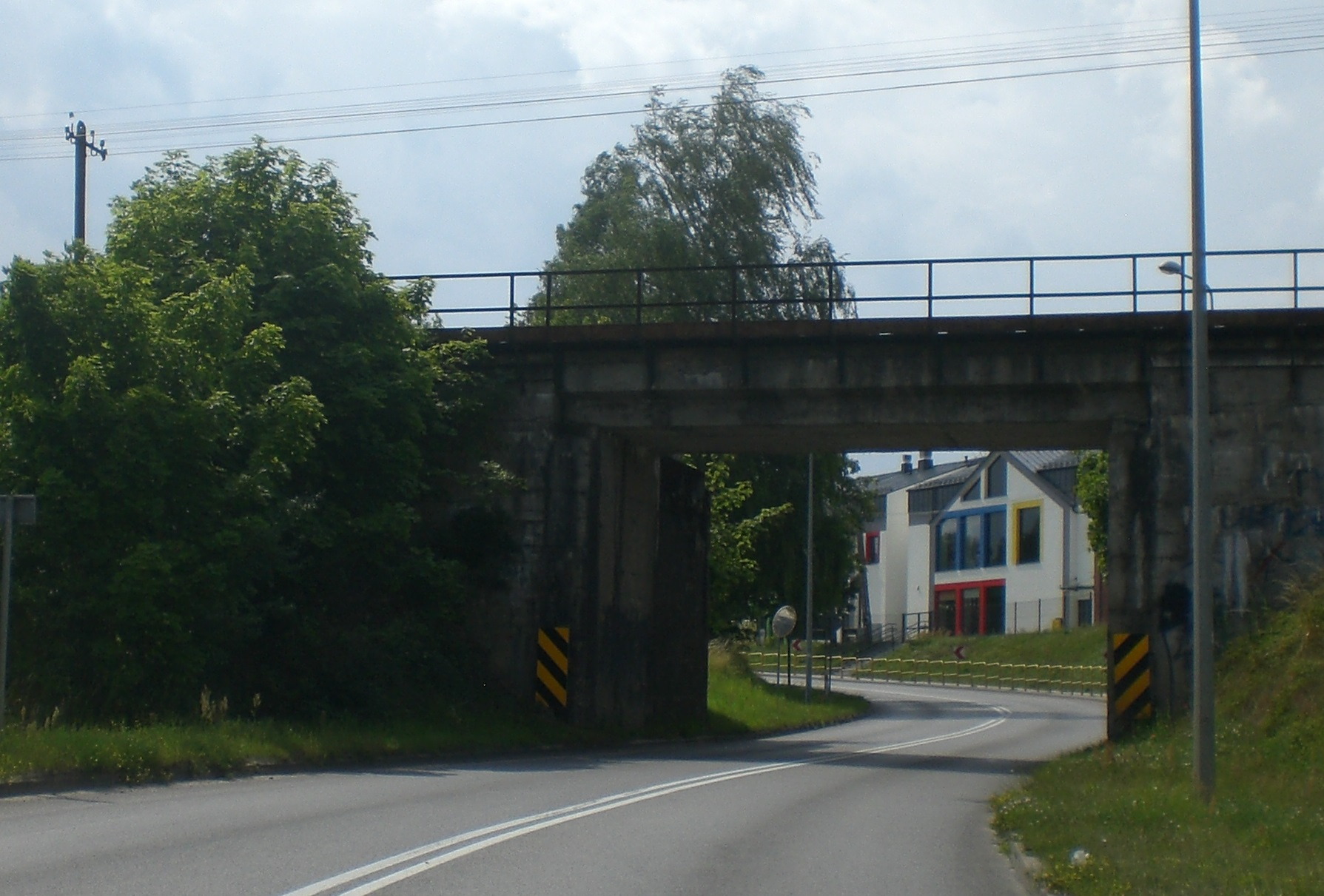

- Location within Poland
- Coordinates: 54°20′8″N 18°20′20″E
- Country: Poland
- Voivodeship: Pomeranian
- County: Kartuzy
- Gmina: Żukowo

Population
  - Total: 926
- Time zone: UTC+1 (CET)
  - Summer (DST): UTC+2 (CEST)
- Vehicle registration: GKA

Borkowo [bɔrˈkɔvɔ] is a village in the administrative district of Gmina Żukowo, within Kartuzy County, Pomeranian Voivodeship, in northern Poland. It is located in the ethnocultural region of Kashubia in the historical region of Pomerania.

== History ==
Borkowo was a private village of Polish nobility, including the Borkowski family, administratively located in the Gdańsk County in the Pomeranian Voivodeship of the Kingdom of Poland.
