= Niestępowo =

Village in Kashubia

- Village
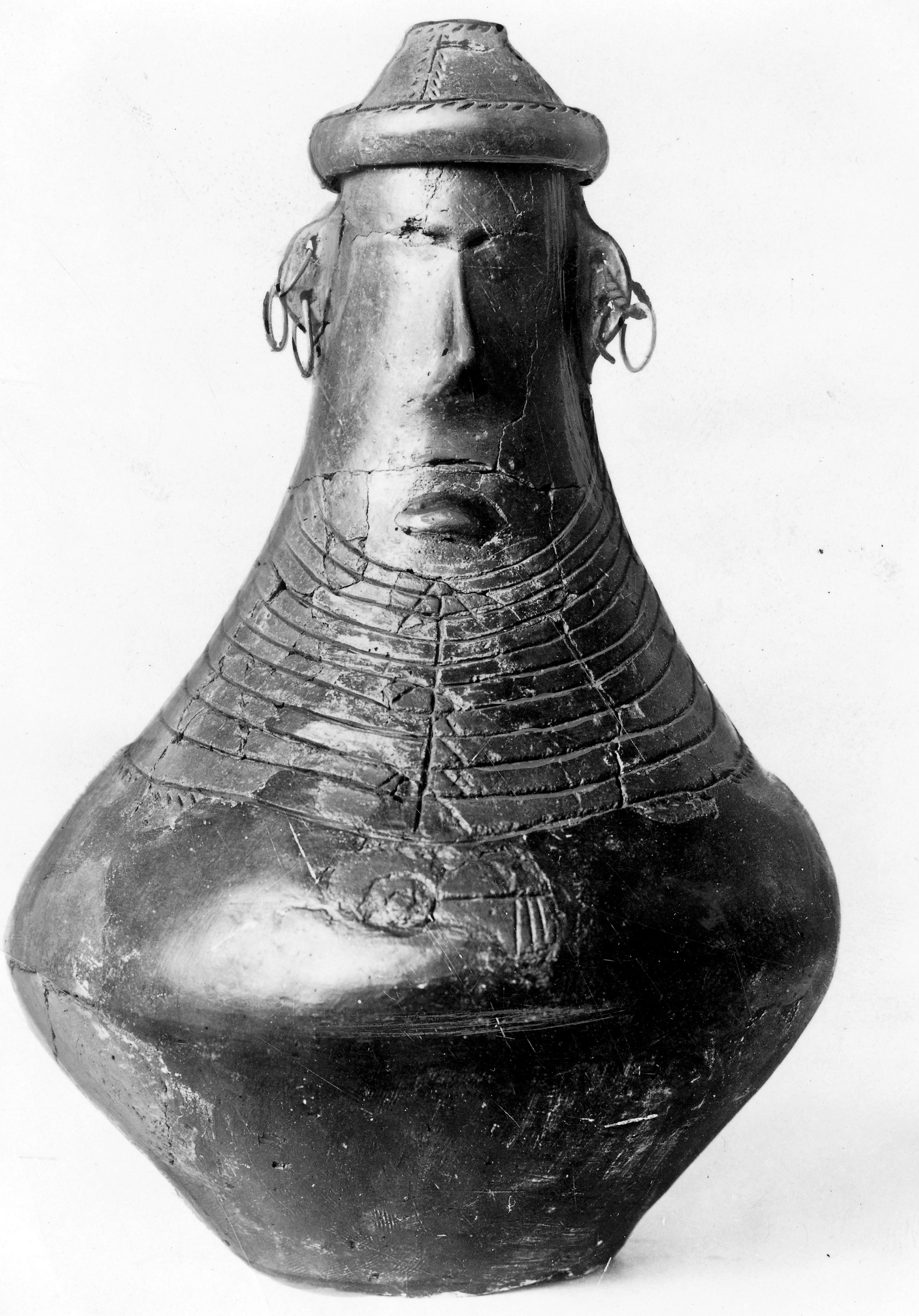
- A funerary urn of the Pomeranian culture unearthed in Niestępowo during an archeological search in 1942

- Location within Poland
- Coordinates: 54°19′9″N 18°25′34″E
- Country: Poland
- Voivodeship: Pomeranian
- County: Kartuzy
- Gmina: Żukowo
- Population: 1,117
- Website: http://niestepowo.pl/

Niestępowo [ɲɛstɛmˈpɔvɔ] is a village in the administrative district of Gmina Żukowo, within Kartuzy County, Pomeranian Voivodeship, in northern Poland.

For details of the history of the region, see History of Pomerania.
