= Reda Rekowo railway station =

Railway station in Reda, Poland

Reda Rekowo
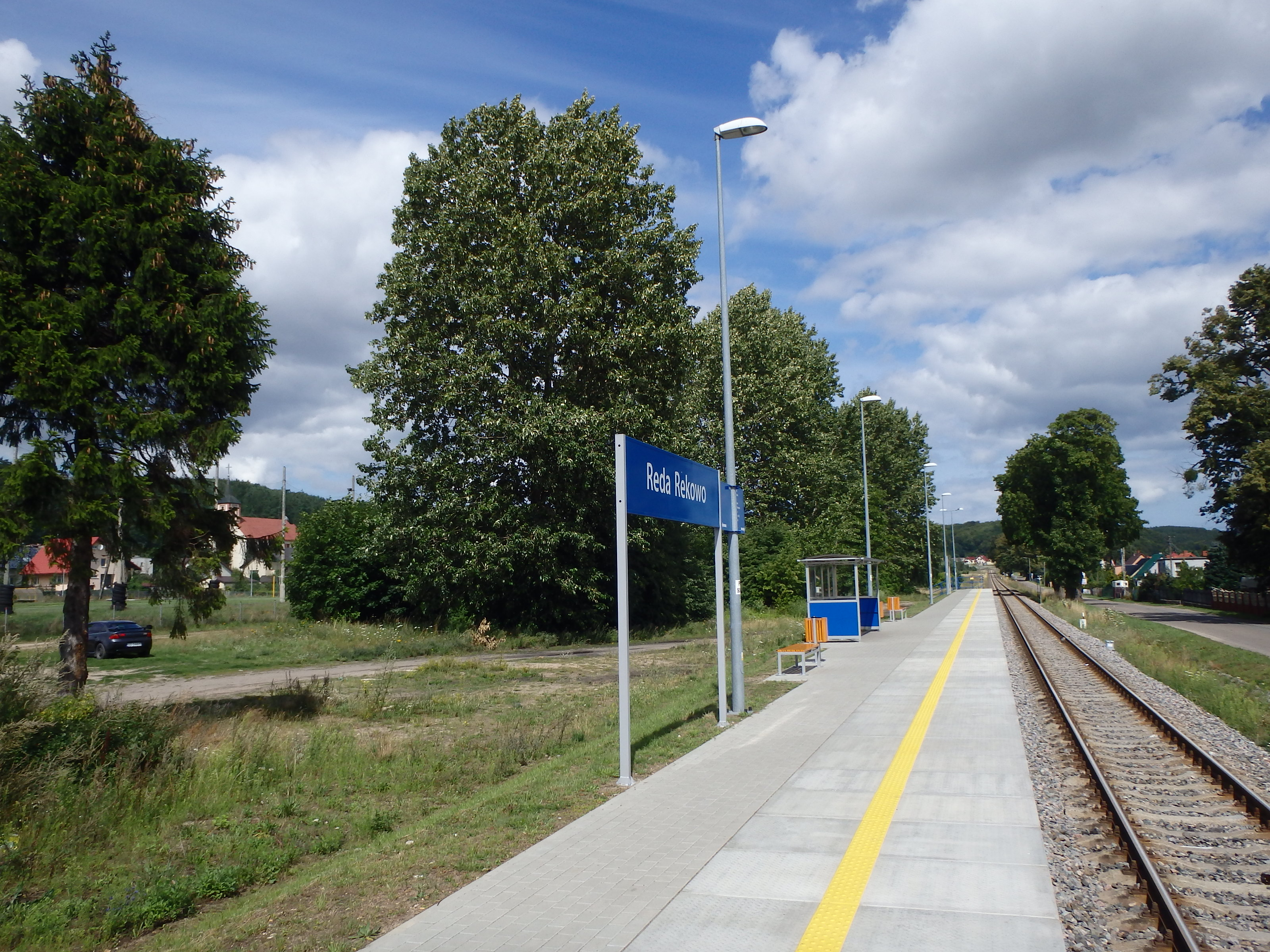
- Reda Rekowo railway station

General information
- Location: Reda, Pomeranian Voivodeship; Poland
- System: Railway Station
- Operator: PKP Polskie Linie Kolejowe
- Line: 213: Reda–Hel railway
- Platforms: 1
- Tracks: 1
Location
- Location within Poland

Reda Rekowo railway station is a railway stop serving the town of Reda, in the Pomeranian Voivodeship, Poland. The station is located on the Reda–Hel railway. The train services are operated by Polregio.

== Train services ==
The station is served by the following services:

- Regional services (R) Władysławowo - Reda - Gdynia Główna
- Regional services (R) Hel - Władysławowo - Reda - Gdynia Główna

Preceding station	Polregio	Following station
Mrzezino towards Władysławowo or Hel	PR	Reda towards Gdynia Główna
