= Puck railway station =

Railway station in Puck, Poland

Puck
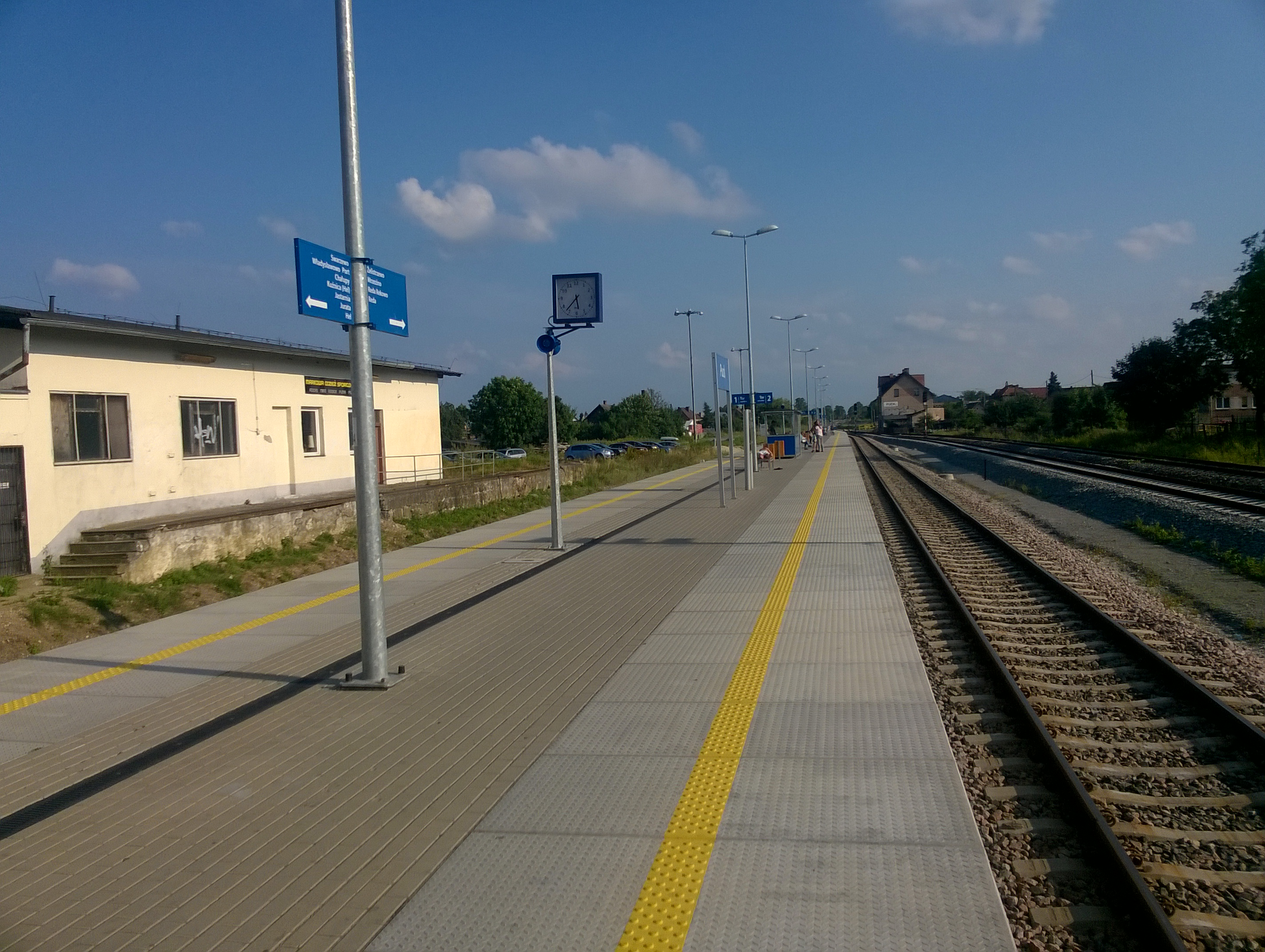
- Puck railway station

General information
- Location: Puck, Pomeranian Voivodeship; Poland
- System: Railway Station
- Operator: PKP Polskie Linie Kolejowe
- Line: 213: Reda–Hel railway
- Platforms: 1
- Tracks: 4

History
- Opened: 15 December 1898; 127 years ago
- Rebuilt: 2014
Location
- Location within Poland

Puck railway station is a railway station serving the town of Puck, in the Pomeranian Voivodeship, Poland. The station opened on 15 December 1898 and is located on the Reda–Hel railway. The train services are operated by Polregio.

== History ==
The station and the town used to be known as Putzig.

In 1928 a new station was built.

On 26 September 1993 the last scheduled steam passenger train operated along the line.

In 1998 the line was modernised. Stations have been equipped with a remotely controlled traffic centre from Gdynia, so that the presence of service stations along the route (in addition to the ticket offices) have become redundant.

== Train services ==
The station is served by the following services:

- Regional services (R) Władysławowo - Reda - Gdynia Główna
- Regional services (R) Hel - Władysławowo - Reda - Gdynia Główna

During the summer months long-distance services also operate to/from Hel.

Preceding station	Polregio	Following station
Swarzewo towards Władysławowo or Hel	PR	Żelistrzewo towards Gdynia Główna
