= Reda railway station =

Railway station in Reda, Poland

Reda
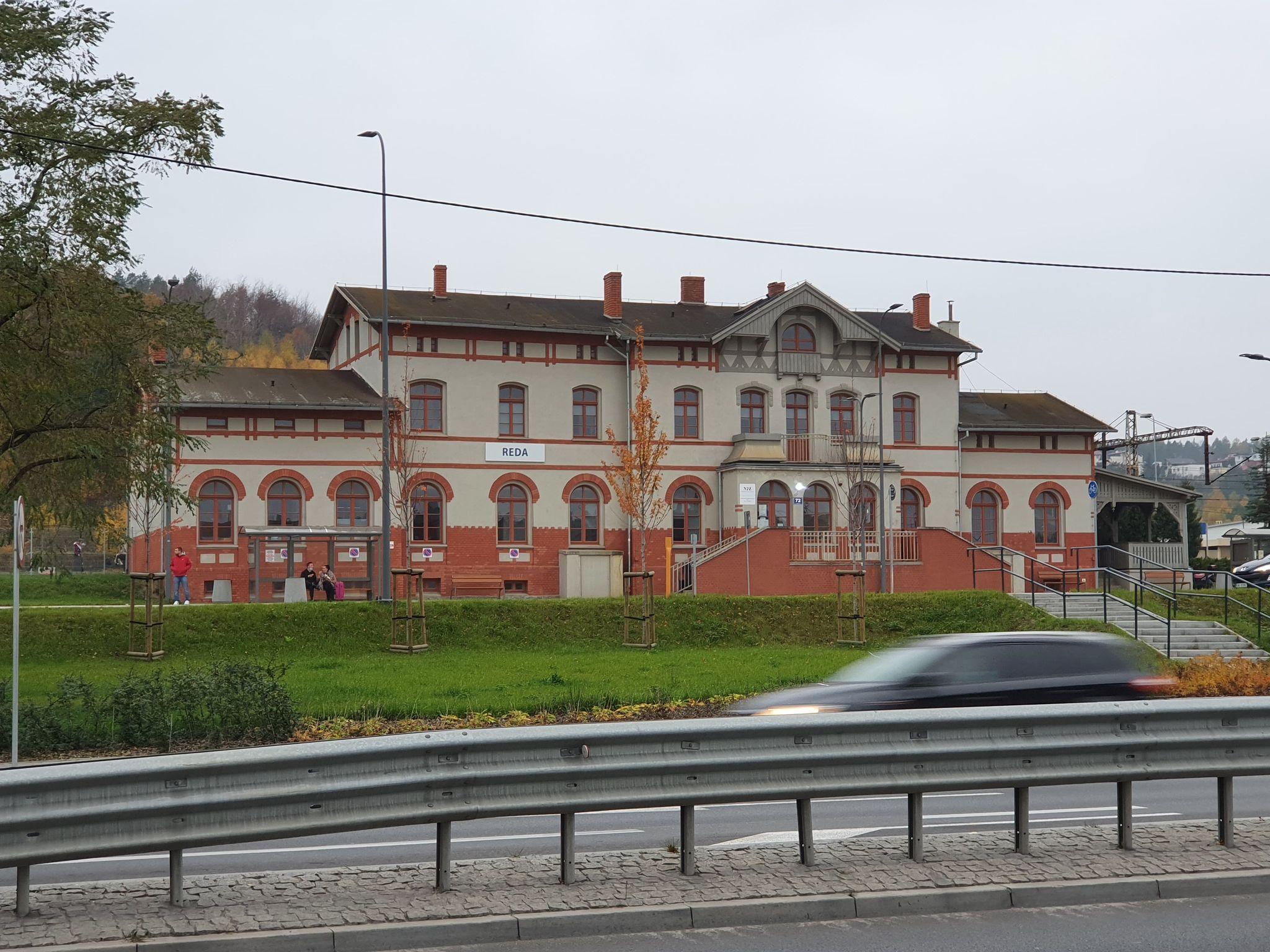
- Reda railway station

General information
- Location: Reda, Pomeranian Voivodeship; Poland
- System: Railway Station
- Operator: PKP Polskie Linie Kolejowe
- Lines: 202: Gdańsk Główny–Stargard railway 213: Reda–Hel railway 250: Gdańsk Śródmieście–Rumia railway
- Platforms: 3

History
- Opened: 1870; 156 years ago
Location
- Location within Poland

Reda railway station is a railway station serving the town of Reda, in the Pomeranian Voivodeship, Poland. The station opened in 1870 and is located on the Gdańsk–Stargard railway, the parallel Gdańsk Śródmieście–Rumia railway and Reda–Hel railway. The train services are operated by Polregio and SKM Tricity.

== Train services ==
The station is served by the following services:

- Regional services (R) Tczew — Słupsk
- Regional services (R) Malbork — Słupsk
- Regional services (R) Elbląg — Słupsk
- Regional services (R) Słupsk — Bydgoszcz Główna
- Regional services (R) Władysławowo - Reda - Gdynia Główna
- Regional services (R) Hel - Władysławowo - Reda - Gdynia Główna
- Regional services (R) Luzino — Gdynia Główna
- Regional services (R) Słupsk — Gdynia Główna
- Szybka Kolej Miejska services (SKM) (Lębork -) Wejherowo - Reda - Rumia - Gdynia - Sopot - Gdansk

Preceding station	Polregio	Following station
Wejherowo towards Słupsk	PR	Rumia towards Tczew
Wejherowo towards Słupsk	PR	Rumia towards Malbork
Wejherowo towards Słupsk	PR	Rumia towards Elbląg
Wejherowo towards Słupsk	PR	Rumia towards Smętowo, Laskowice Pomorskie, or Bydgoszcz Główna
Wejherowo towards Luzino or Słupsk	PR	Rumia towards Gdynia Główna
Reda Rekowo towards Władysławowo or Hel	PR	Rumia towards Gdynia Główna
Preceding station	SKM Tricity	Following station
Reda Pieleszewo towards Wejherowo or Lębork	SKM Tricity	Rumia towards Gdańsk Śródmieście
