= Żelistrzewo railway station =

Railway station in Żelistrzewo, Poland

Coordinates: 54.6742°N 18.4161°E

Żelistrzewo
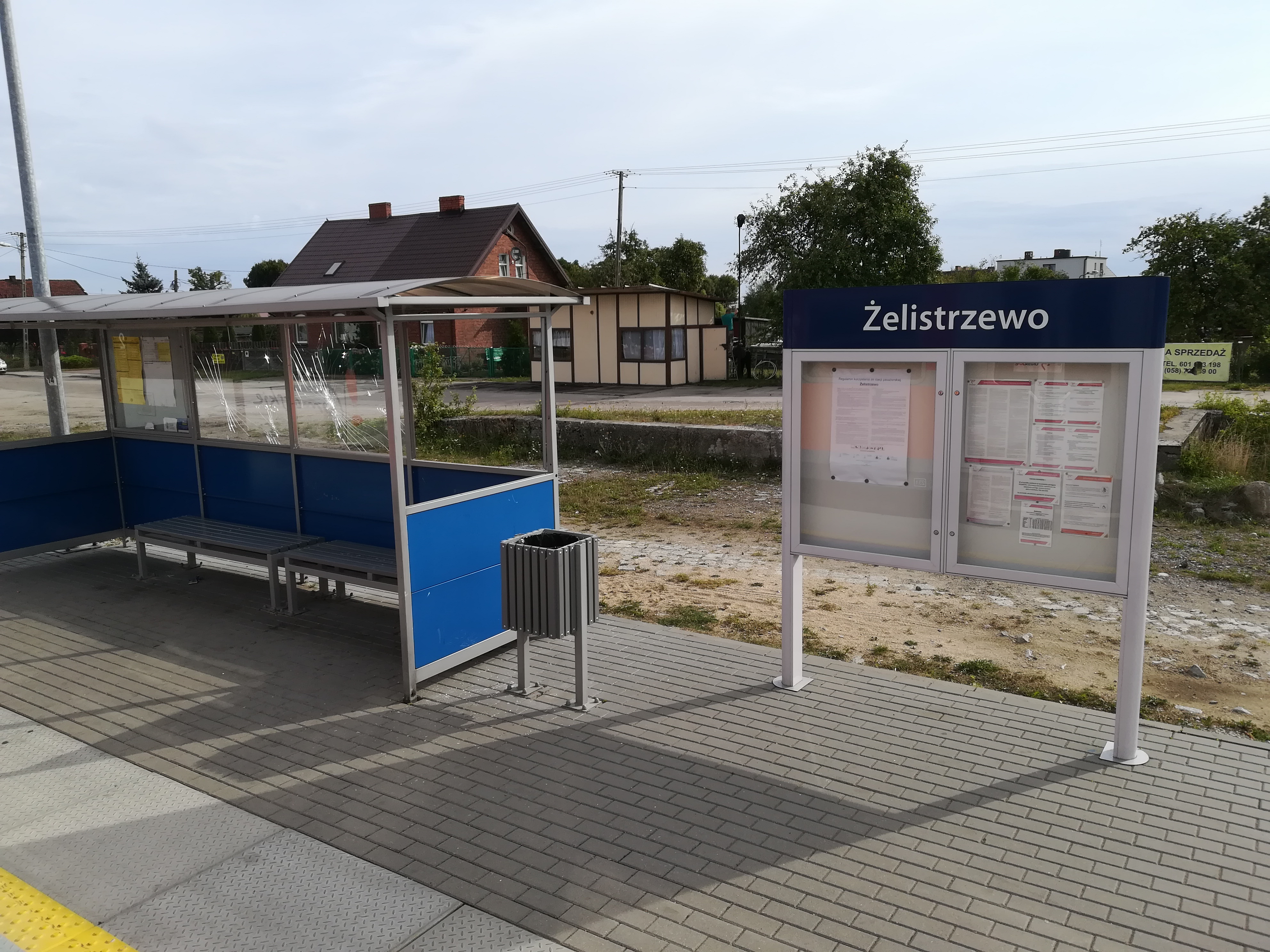
- Żelistrzewo railway station

General information
- Location: Żelistrzewo, Pomeranian Voivodeship; Poland
- System: Railway Station
- Operator: PKP Polskie Linie Kolejowe
- Line: 213: Reda–Hel railway
- Platforms: 1
- Tracks: 1

History
- Opened: 15 December 1898; 127 years ago
Location
- Location within Poland

Żelistrzewo railway station is a railway station serving the village of Żelistrzewo, in the Pomeranian Voivodeship, Poland. The station opened on 15 December 1898 and is located on the Reda–Hel railway. The train services are operated by Polregio.

== History ==
The station and the town used to be known as Sellen (Kr. Neustadt).

On 26 September 1993 the last scheduled steam passenger train operated along the line.

In 1998, the line underwent modernization. Stations were upgraded with a remotely controlled traffic center based in Gdynia, (in addition to the ticket offices) eliminating the need for service stations along the route.

== Train services ==
The station is served by the following services:

- Regional services (R) Władysławowo - Reda - Gdynia Główna
- Regional services (R) Hel - Władysławowo - Reda - Gdynia Główna

During the summer months long-distance services also operate to/from Hel.

| Preceding station | Polregio | Following station |
|---|---|---|
| Puck towards Władysławowo or Hel | PR | Mrzezino towards Gdynia Główna |
