= Chałupy railway station =

Railway station in Chałupy, Poland

Coordinates: 54°45′44″N 18°30′01″E

Chałupy
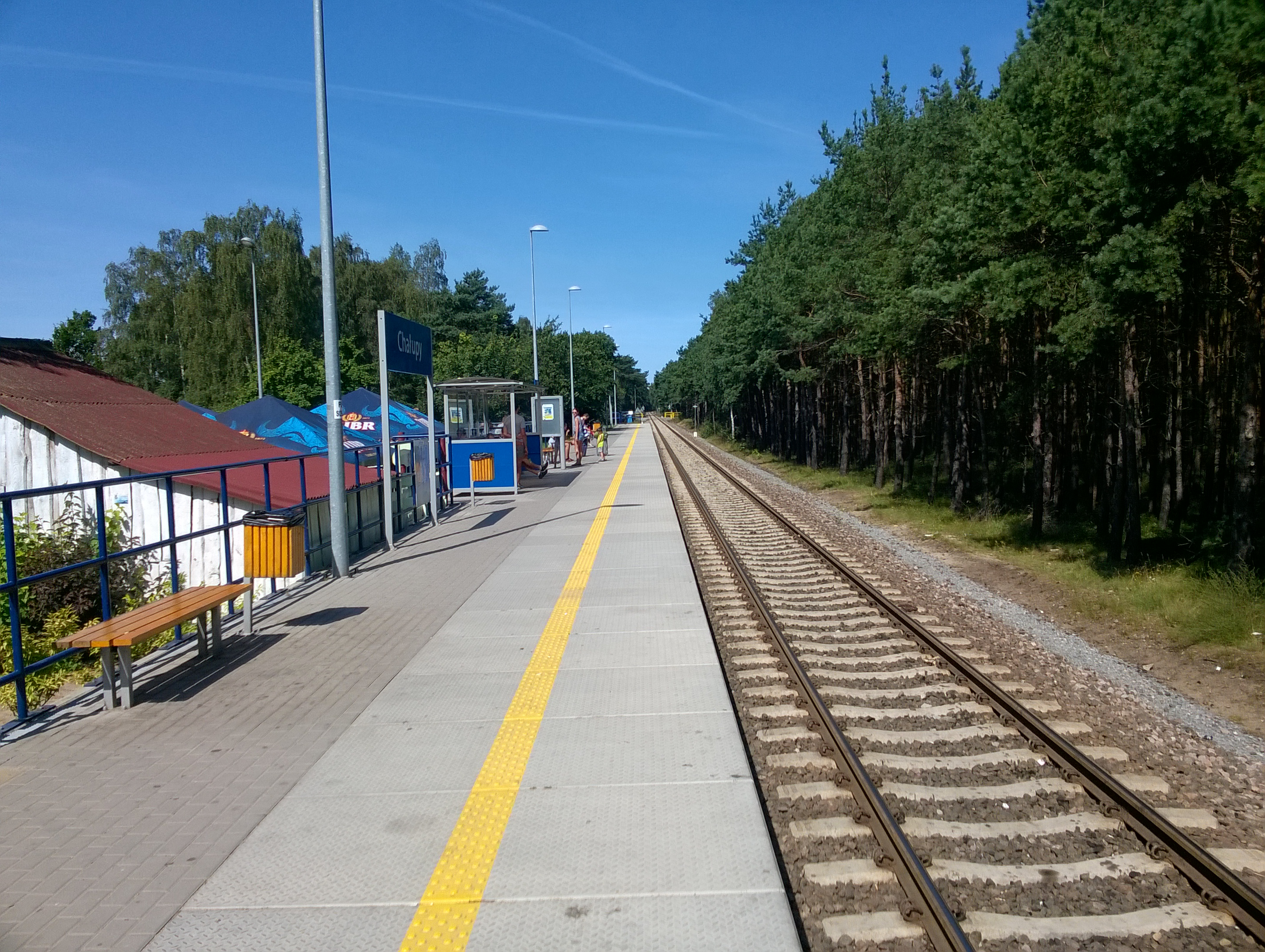
- Chałupy railway station

General information
- Location: Chałupy, Pomeranian Voivodeship; Poland
- System: Railway Station
- Operator: PKP Polskie Linie Kolejowe
- Line: 213: Reda–Hel railway
- Platforms: 1
- Tracks: 1

History
- Opened: 1922; 104 years ago
- Rebuilt: 2013
Location
- Location within Poland

Chałupy railway station is a railway station serving the town of Chałupy, in the Pomeranian Voivodeship, Poland. The station opened in 1922 and is located on the Reda–Hel railway. The train services are operated by Polregio.

The station used to be known as Ziegenhagen.

== Modernisation ==
The station was rebuilt in 2013 as part of the modernisation of the Reda–Hel railway.

== Train services ==
The station is served by the following services:

- Regional services (R) Hel - Władysławowo - Reda - Gdynia Główna

During the summer months long-distance services also operate to/from Hel.

Preceding station	Polregio	Following station
Kuźnica towards Hel	PR	Władysławowo Port towards Gdynia Główna
