= Kuźnica railway station =

Railway station in Poland

Coordinates: 54.7360°N 18.5773°E

Kuźnica (Hel)
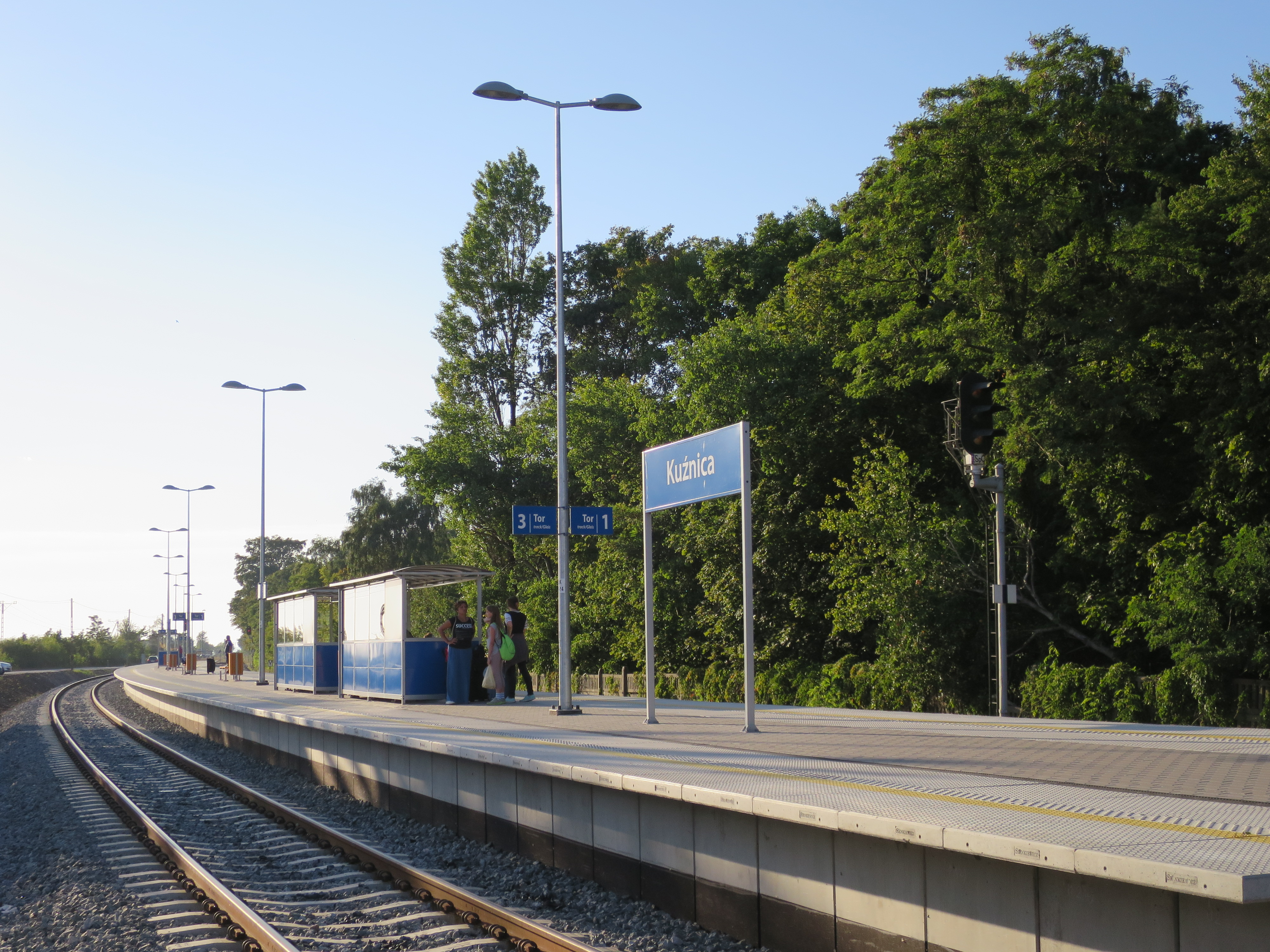
- Kuźnica railway station

General information
- Location: Kuźnica, Pomeranian Voivodeship; Poland
- System: Railway Station
- Operator: PKP Polskie Linie Kolejowe
- Line: 213: Reda–Hel railway
- Platforms: 1
- Tracks: 2
Location
- Location within Poland

Kuźnica railway station is a railway station serving the town of Kuźnica, in the Pomeranian Voivodeship, Poland. The station is located on the Reda–Hel railway. The train services are operated by Polregio.

The station used to be known as Kußfeld.

== Train services ==
The station is served by the following services:

- Regional services (R) Hel - Władysławowo - Reda - Gdynia Główna

During the summer months long-distance services also operate to/from Hel.

| Preceding station | Polregio | Following station |
|---|---|---|
| Jastarnia Wczasy towards Hel | PR | Chałupy towards Gdynia Główna |
