= Rumia railway station =

Railway station in Rumia, Poland

Rumia
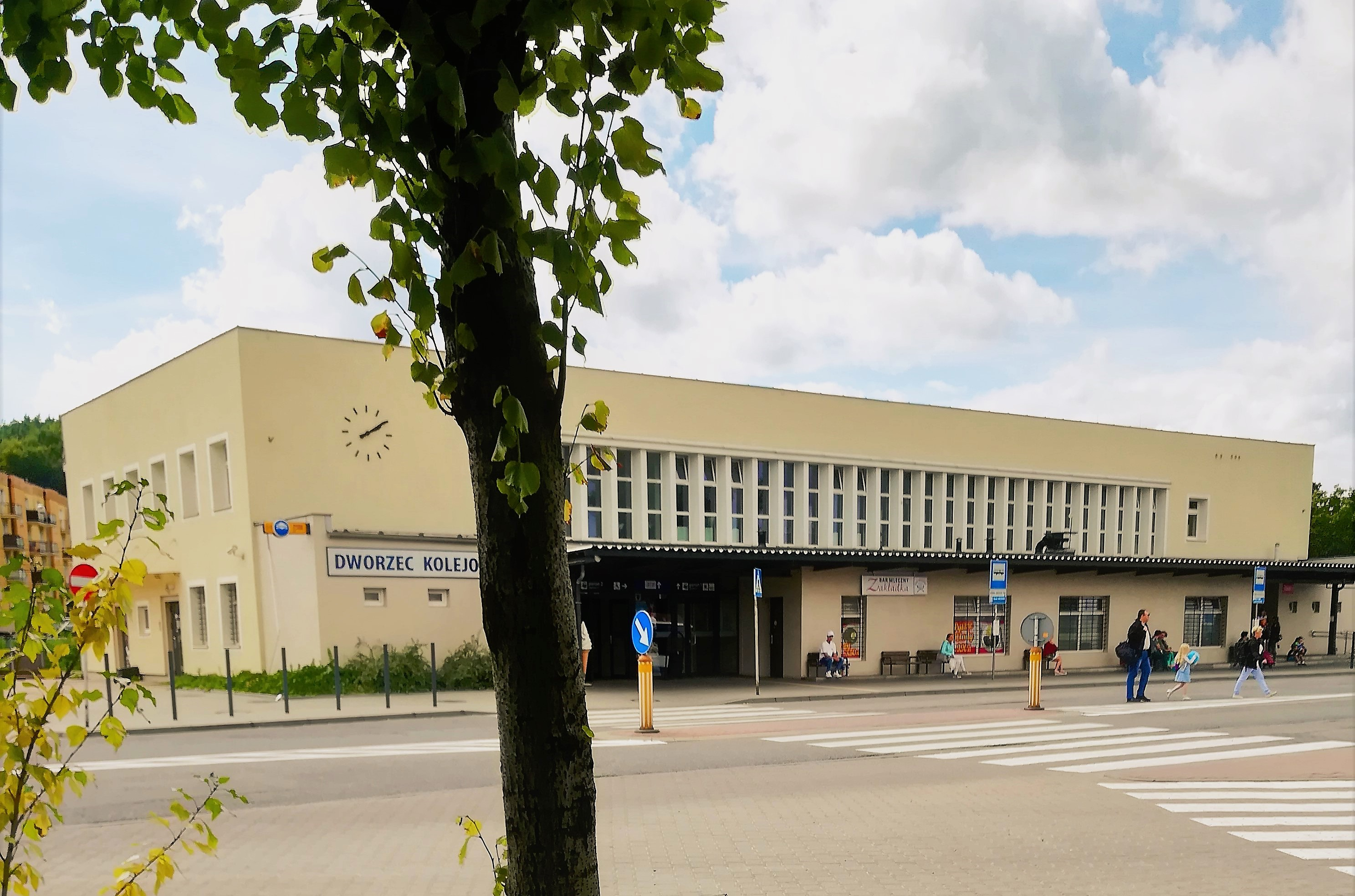
- Rumia railway station in 2018

General information
- Location: Rumia, Pomeranian Voivodeship; Poland
- System: Railway Station
- Operator: PKP Polskie Linie Kolejowe; SKM Tricity
- Lines: 202: Gdańsk Główny–Stargard railway 250: Gdańsk Śródmieście–Rumia railway
- Platforms: 3

History
- Opened: 1880; 146 years ago
Location
- Location within Poland

Rumia railway station is the main railway station serving the town of Rumia, in the Pomeranian Voivodeship, Poland. The station opened in 1880 and is located on the Gdańsk–Stargard railway and the parallel Gdańsk Śródmieście–Rumia railway. The train services are operated by PKP, Polregio and SKM Tricity.

== Train services ==
The station is served by the following services:

- Intercity services (IC) Łódź Fabryczna — Warszawa — Gdańsk Glowny — Kołobrzeg
- Intercity services (IC) Szczecin - Koszalin - Słupsk - Gdynia - Gdańsk
- Intercity services (IC) Szczecin - Koszalin - Słupsk - Gdynia - Gdańsk - Elbląg/Iława - Olsztyn
- Intercity services (IC) Szczecin - Koszalin - Słupsk - Gdynia - Gdańsk - Elbląg - Olsztyn - Białystok
- Intercity services (TLK) Kołobrzeg — Gdynia Główna — Warszawa Wschodnia — Kraków Główny
- Regional services (R) Tczew — Słupsk
- Regional services (R) Malbork — Słupsk
- Regional services (R) Elbląg — Słupsk
- Regional services (R) Słupsk — Bydgoszcz Główna
- Regional services (R) Władysławowo - Reda - Gdynia Główna
- Regional services (R) Hel - Władysławowo - Reda - Gdynia Główna
- Regional services (R) Luzino — Gdynia Główna
- Regional services (R) Słupsk — Gdynia Główna
- Szybka Kolej Miejska services (SKM) (Lębork -) Wejherowo - Reda - Rumia - Gdynia - Sopot - Gdansk

Preceding station	PKP Intercity	Following station
Wejherowo towards Kołobrzeg	IC	Gdynia Główna towards Łódź Fabryczna
Wejherowo towards Szczecin Główny	IC	Gdynia Główna towards Gdańsk Główny
Wejherowo towards Szczecin Główny	IC	Gdynia Główna towards Olsztyn Główny
Wejherowo towards Szczecin Główny	IC	Gdynia Główna towards Białystok
Wejherowo towards Kołobrzeg	TLK	Gdynia Główna towards Kraków Główny
Preceding station	Polregio	Following station
Reda towards Słupsk	PR	Gdynia Chylonia towards Tczew
Reda towards Słupsk	PR	Gdynia Chylonia towards Malbork
Reda towards Słupsk	PR	Gdynia Chylonia towards Elbląg
Reda towards Słupsk	PR	Gdynia Chylonia towards Smętowo, Laskowice Pomorskie, or Bydgoszcz Główna
Reda towards Luzino or Słupsk	PR	Gdynia Chylonia towards Gdynia Główna
Reda towards Władysławowo or Hel	PR	Gdynia Chylonia towards Gdynia Główna
Preceding station	SKM Tricity	Following station
Reda towards Wejherowo or Lębork	SKM Tricity	Rumia Janowo towards Gdańsk Śródmieście
