= Władysławowo Port railway station =

Railway station in Władysławowo, Poland

Władysławowo Port
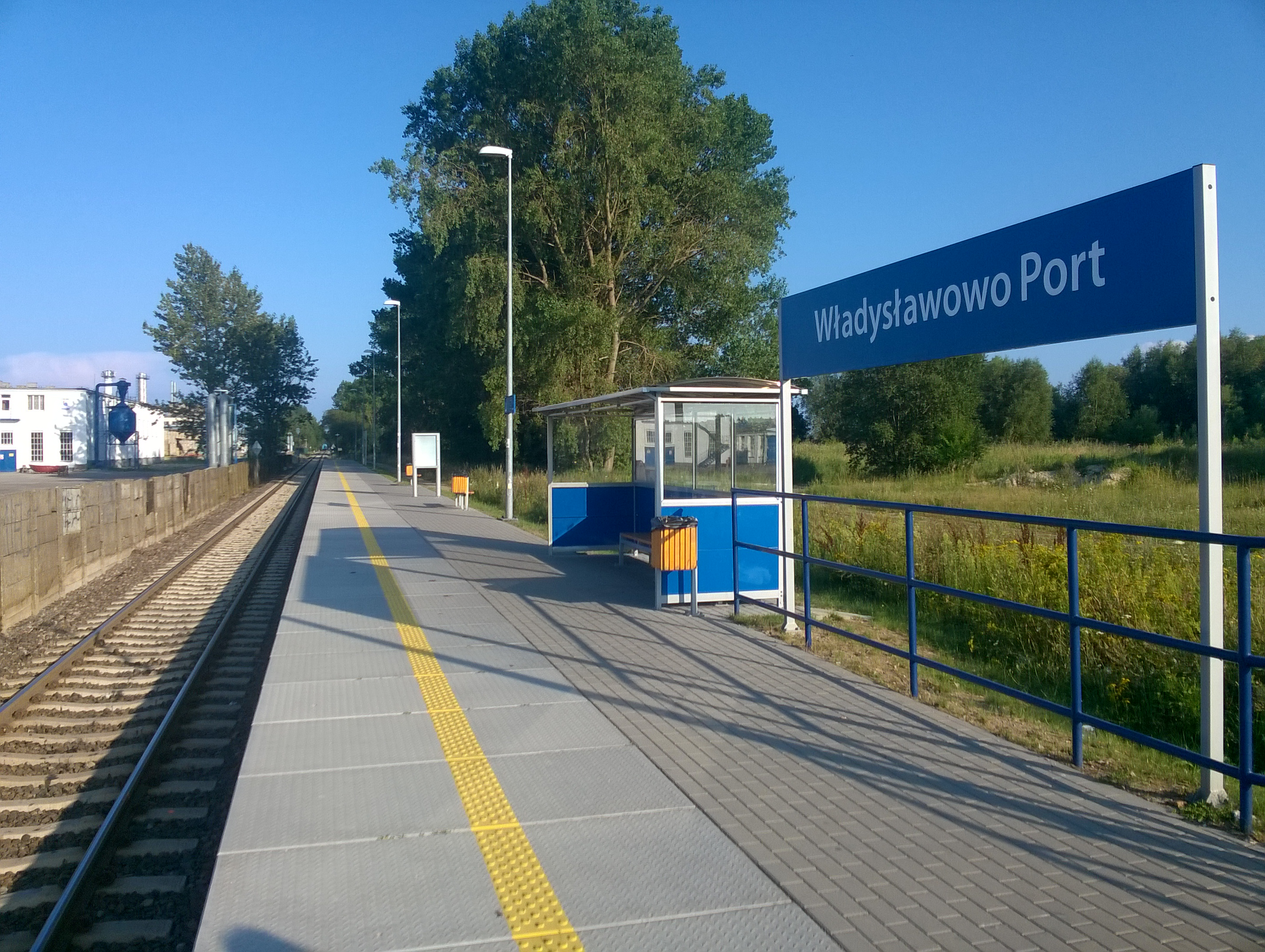
- Władysławowo Port railway station

General information
- Location: Władysławowo, Pomeranian Voivodeship; Poland
- System: Railway Station
- Operator: PKP Polskie Linie Kolejowe
- Line: 213: Reda–Hel railway
- Platforms: 1
- Tracks: 1

History
- Rebuilt: 2013
Location
- Location within Poland

Władysławowo Port railway station is a railway station serving the town of Władysławowo, in the Pomeranian Voivodeship, Poland. The station is located on the Reda–Hel railway, close to the port of Władysławowo. The train services are operated by Polregio.

The station used to be known as Wielka Wieś.

== Modernisation ==
The station was rebuilt in 2013 as part of the modernisation of the Reda–Hel railway.

== Train services ==
The station is served by the following services:

- Regional services (R) Hel - Władysławowo - Reda - Gdynia Główna

During the summer months long-distance services also operate to/from Hel.

Preceding station	Polregio	Following station
Chałupy towards Hel	PR	Władysławowo towards Gdynia Główna
