= Jurata railway station =

Railway station in Pomeranian Voivodeship, Poland

Coordinates: 54.6849°N 18.7134°E

Jurata
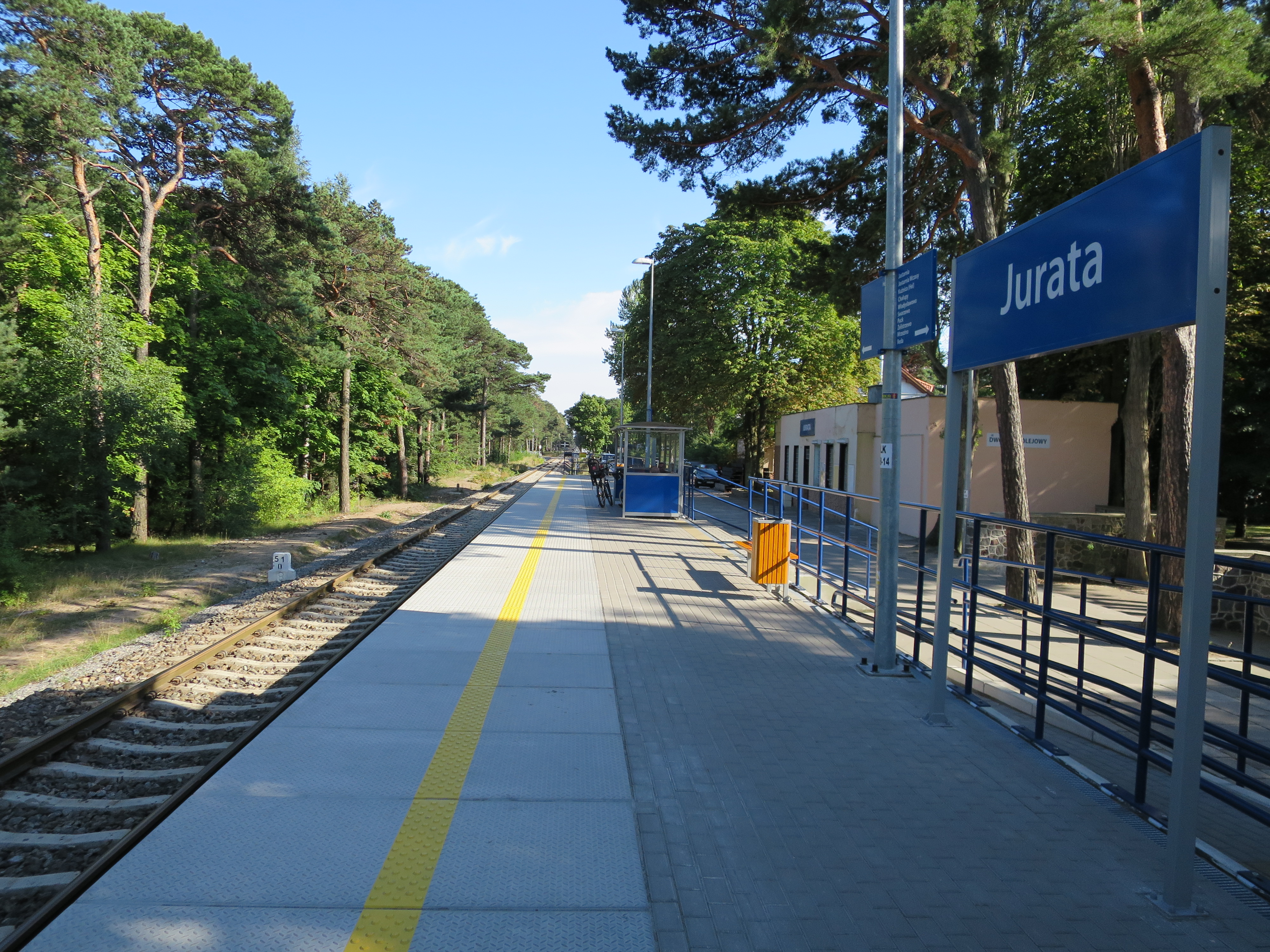
- Jurata railway station

General information
- Location: Jurata, Pomeranian Voivodeship; Poland
- System: Railway station
- Operator: PKP Polskie Linie Kolejowe
- Line: 213: Reda–Hel railway
- Platforms: 1
- Tracks: 1

History
- Rebuilt: 2015
Location
- Location within Poland

Jurata railway station is a railway stop serving the town of Jurata, in the Pomeranian Voivodeship, Poland. The station is located on the Reda–Hel railway line. The train services are operated by Polregio.

The station used to be known as Helaheide.

== Modernisation ==
The station was rebuilt during 2015 as part of the modernisation of the Reda–Hel railway.

== Train services ==
The station is served by the following services:

- Regional services (R) Hel – Władysławowo – Reda – Gdynia Główna

During the summer months long-distance services also operate to and from Hel.

Preceding station	Polregio	Following station
Hel Terminus	PR	Jastarnia towards Gdynia Główna
