= Jastarnia Wczasy railway station =

Railway station in Jastarnia, Poland

Jastarnia Wczasy
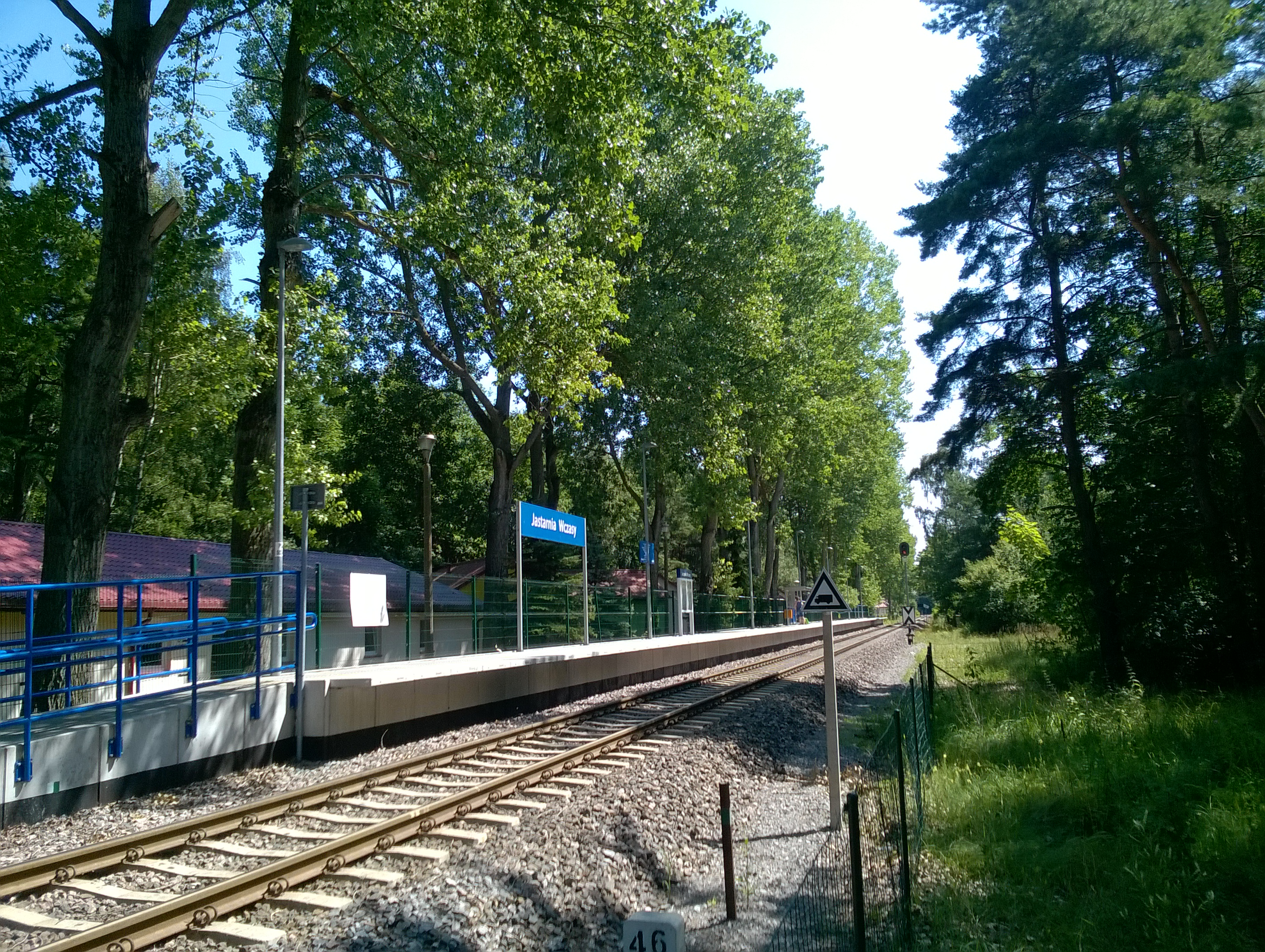
- Jastarnia Wczasy railway station

General information
- Location: Jastarnia; Poland
- System: Railway Station
- Operator: PKP Polskie Linie Kolejowe
- Line: 213: Reda–Hel railway
- Platforms: 1
- Tracks: 1
Location
- Location within Poland

Jastarnia Wczasy railway station is a railway stop serving the village of Chłapowo, in the Pomeranian Voivodeship, Poland. The station is located on the Reda–Hel railway. The train services are operated by Polregio.

== Train services ==
The station is served by the following services:

- Regional services (R) Hel - Władysławowo - Reda - Gdynia Główna

During the summer months long-distance services also operate to/from Hel.

Preceding station	Polregio	Following station
Jastarnia towards Hel	PR	Kuźnica towards Gdynia Główna
