= Jastarnia railway station =

Railway station in Jastarnia, Poland

Coordinates: 54.7012°N 18.6775°E

Jastarnia
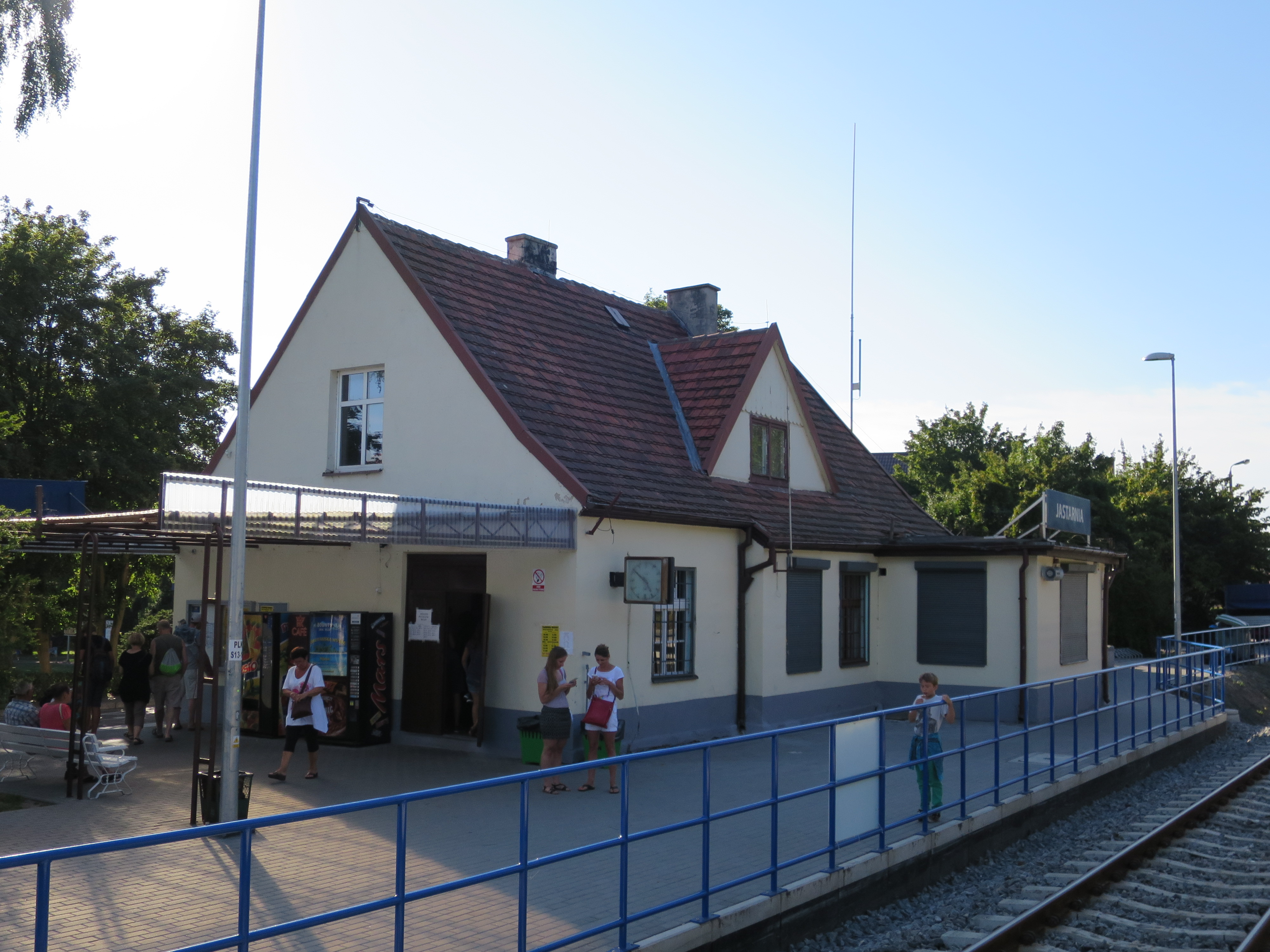
- Jastarnia railway station

General information
- Location: Jastarnia, Pomeranian Voivodeship; Poland
- System: Railway Station
- Operator: PKP Polskie Linie Kolejowe
- Line: 213: Reda–Hel railway
- Platforms: 1
- Tracks: 2

History
- Rebuilt: 2011-2013
Location
- Location within Poland

Jastarnia railway station is a railway station serving the town of Jastarnia, in the Pomeranian Voivodeship, Poland. The station is located on the Reda–Hel railway. The train services are operated by Polregio.

The station used to be known as Heisternest.

== Modernisation ==
The station was rebuilt between 2011 and 2013 as part of the modernisation of the Reda–Hel railway.

== Train services ==
The station is served by the following services:

- Regional services (R) Hel - Władysławowo - Reda - Gdynia Główna

During the summer months long-distance services also operate to/from Hel.

Preceding station	Polregio	Following station
Jurata towards Hel	PR	Jastarnia Wczasy towards Gdynia Główna
