= Jastarnia (disambiguation) =

Jastarnia is a resort town in northern Poland.

Jastarnia may also refer to:

- Jastarnia Lighthouse, a lighthouse in Poland
- Jastarnia railway station, a railway station in Jastarnia, Poland
- Jastarnia Wczasy railway station, railway station in Jastarnia, Poland
