= Rumia Janowo railway station =

Railway station in Rumia, Poland

Rumia Janowo
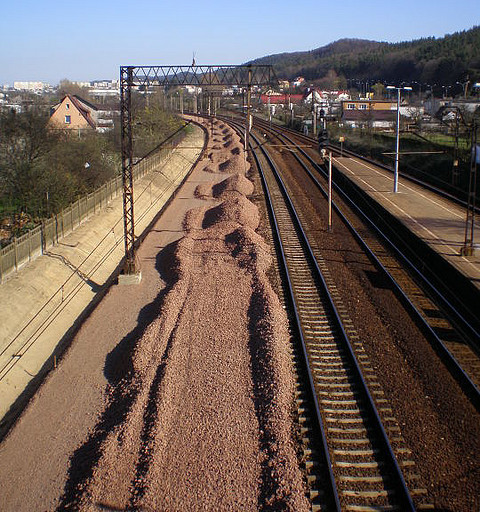
- Rumia Janowo railway station

General information
- Location: Rumia, Pomeranian Voivodeship; Poland
- System: Railway Station
- Operator: SKM Tricity
- Line: 250: Gdańsk Śródmieście–Rumia railway
- Platforms: 2

History
- Opened: 1870; 156 years ago
Location
- Location within Poland

Rumia Janowo railway station is a railway station serving the town of Rumia, in the Pomeranian Voivodeship, Poland. The station opened in 1870 and is located on the Gdańsk Śródmieście–Rumia railway. The train services are operated by SKM Tricity.

== Train services ==
The station is served by the following service(s):

- Szybka Kolej Miejska services (SKM) (Lębork -) Wejherowo - Reda - Rumia - Gdynia - Sopot - Gdansk

| Preceding station | SKM Tricity | Following station |
|---|---|---|
| Rumia towards Wejherowo or Lębork | SKM Tricity | Gdynia Cisowa towards Gdańsk Śródmieście |
