= Wejherowo Śmiechowo railway station =

Railway station in Wejherowo, Poland

Wejherowo Śmiechowo
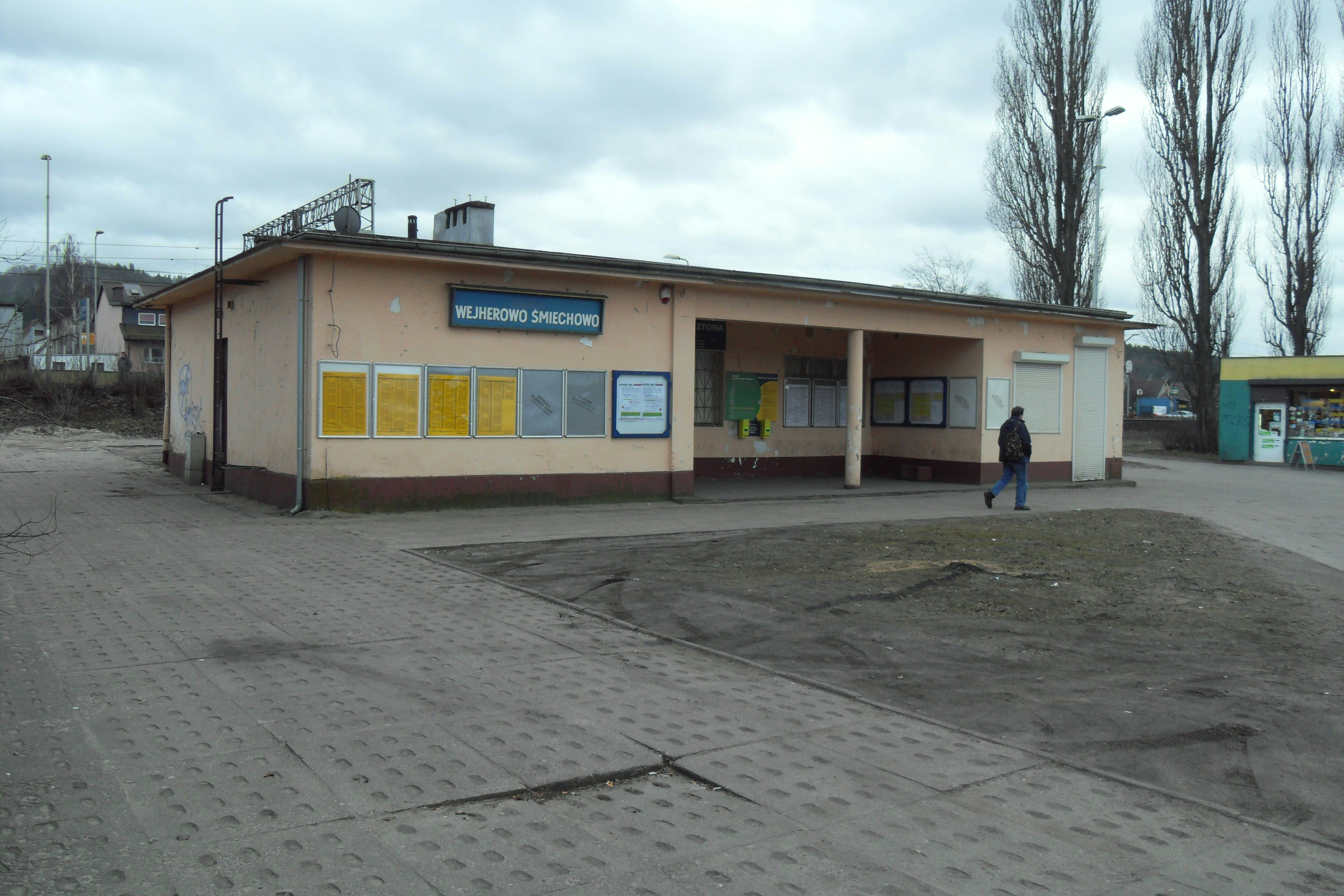

General information
- Location: Wejherowo, Pomeranian Voivodeship; Poland
- System: Railway Station
- Operator: SKM Tricity
- Line: 202: Gdańsk–Stargard railway
- Platforms: 2
- Tracks: 2
Location
- Location within Poland

Wejherowo Śmiechowo railway station is a railway station serving the town of Wejherowo, in the Pomeranian Voivodeship, Poland. The station is located on the Gdańsk–Stargard railway. The train services are operated by SKM Tricity.

== Train services ==
The station is served by the following service(s):

- Szybka Kolej Miejska services (SKM) (Lębork -) Wejherowo - Reda - Rumia - Gdynia - Sopot - Gdansk

Preceding station	SKM Tricity	Following station
Wejherowo Nanice towards Wejherowo or Lębork	SKM Tricity	Reda Pieleszewo towards Gdańsk Śródmieście
