= Rumia =

Rumia Rëmiô (Kashubian)
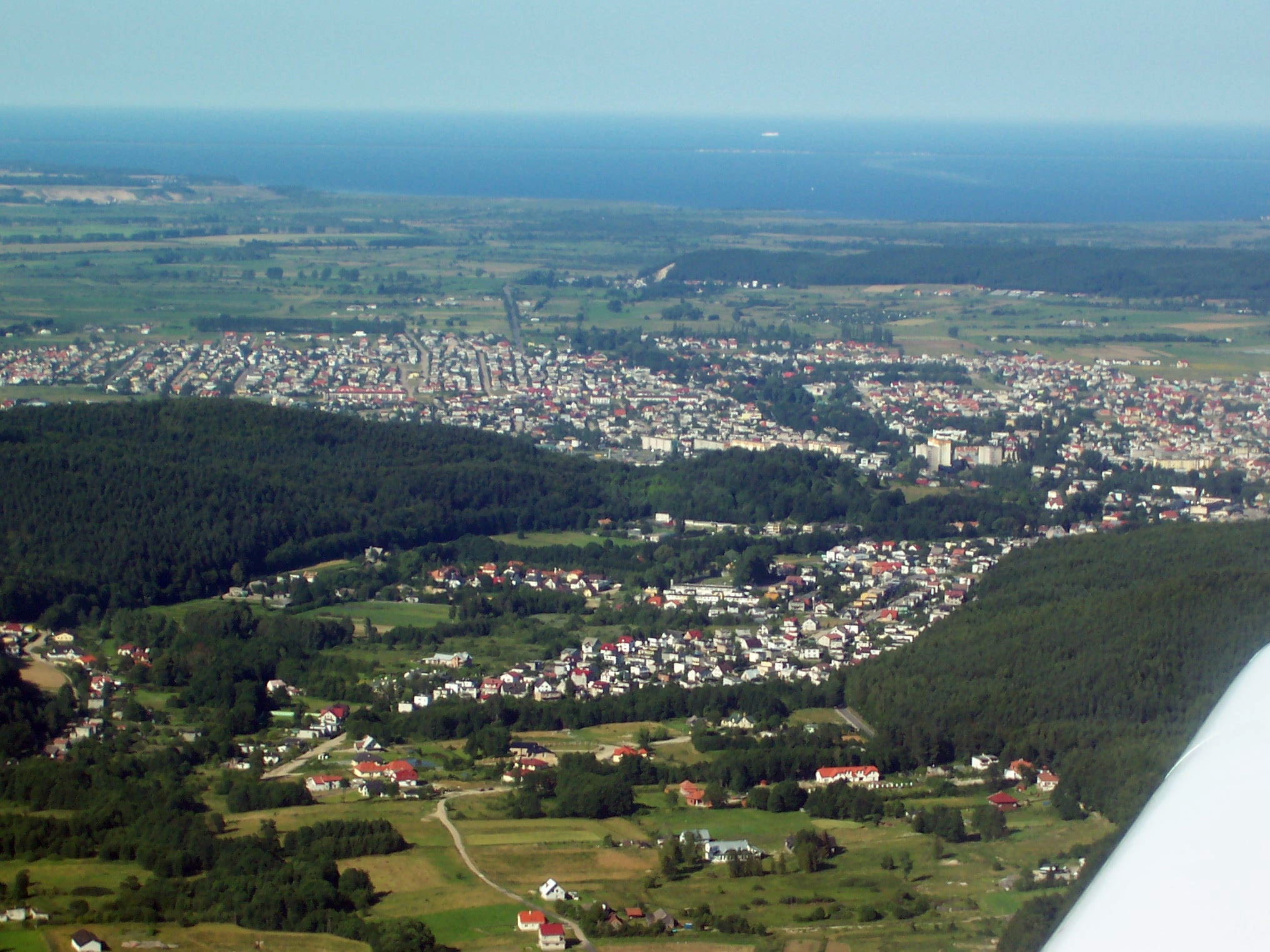
- Aerial view

- Flag Coat of arms

- Location within Poland
- Coordinates: 54°34′0″N 18°24′0″E
- Country: Poland
- Voivodeship: Pomeranian
- County: Wejherowo
- Gmina: Rumia (urban gmina)
- First mentioned: 1224
- Town rights: 1954

Government
  - Mayor: Michał Pasieczny

Area
  - City: 30.10 km^{2} (11.62 sq mi)

Population (2023)
  - City: 53,316
  - Density: 1,771/km^{2} (4,588/sq mi)
  - Metro: 130,000
- Time zone: UTC+1 (CET)
  - Summer (DST): UTC+2 (CEST)
- Postal code: 84-230
- Area code: +48 58
- Car plates: GWE
- Website: http://www.rumia.eu

Rumia (Polish: [ˈrumja]; Kashubian: Rëmiô; German: Rahmel) is a town in northern Poland, in the Wejherowo County in Pomeranian Voivodeship, with approx. 53,000 inhabitants. It is a part of the Kashubian Tricity (Rumia, Reda, Wejherowo) and a suburb part of the metropolitan area of the Tricity. It is situated in Kashubia in the historic region of Pomerania. It is connected by well-developed railway and highway connections to the Tricity, an urban agglomeration of almost 1 million inhabitants on the coast of Gdańsk Bay.

== History ==
Slavic Lechitic settlements existed in present-day Rumia in the Early Middle Ages. The region formed part of Poland since the establishment of the state in the 10th century. The village of Rumia (then Rumina) was first mentioned in 1224 when it was awarded by Świętopełk II, later duke of Eastern Pomerania to the Cistercian convent in Oliwa (today part of Gdańsk). The name of Rumia was applied also to the neighbourhoods of Janowo and Biała Rzeka. In 1285 Mestwin II, duke of Pomerania stopped here to issue official documents. It was part of Poland until 1309, when it was annexed by the State of the Teutonic Order. Poland tried to regain the region through diplomacy as it did not recognize its annexation by the Teutonic Knights, and from 1325 the local Cistercians secretly resumed collections of the Peter's Pence tax on behalf of Poland for the Catholic Church. From 1320 to 1342 a Cistercian–Teutonic conflict took place, which ended with a privilege in which the Teutonic Knights confirmed the Cisterian possessions in the region, including Rumia.

In 1454 King Casimir IV Jagiellon re-incorporated the region to the Kingdom of Poland, and after the subsequent Thirteen Years' War the Teutonic Knights renounced their claims to the region in 1466. Afterwards Rumia was administratively located in the Puck County in the Pomeranian Voivodeship of the Kingdom of Poland until the Partitions of Poland. It remained a church village of the Cistercians from Oliwa, while the present-day district of Zagórze was a royal village of the Polish Crown, and also new craft settlements (also present-day districts) Szmelta and Stara Piła emerged.

In 1772 it was annexed by the Kingdom of Prussia in the First Partition of Poland, and from 1773 it belonged to the newly established province of West Prussia until 1871 when it also became part of the unified German Empire. In 1905 Rumia (then officially Rahmel) had 760 inhabitants. 579 of them were Germans and 180 were Kashubian or Polish, while the present-day districts of Zagórze and Janowo had 754 and 161 inhabitants respectively, and remained predominantly Polish-Kashubian. Rumia was a German language island in a predominantly Slavic speaking region.

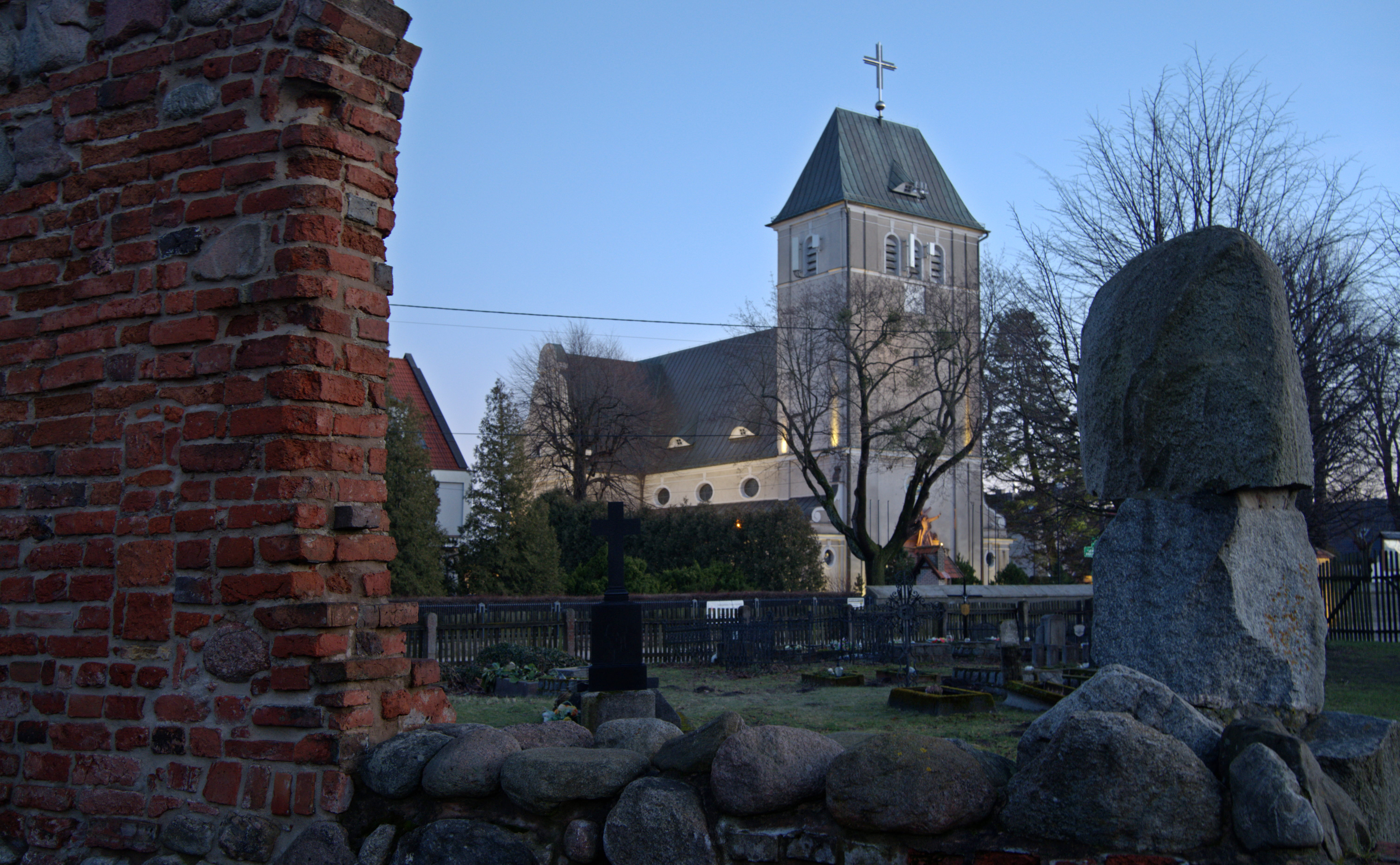
Exaltation of the Holy Cross church

Germany's defeat in World War I gave Poles hope for the restoration of independent Poland. The Poles established a local Polish library, and on December 29, 1918 the first Polish pro-independence rally took place in Rumia. Germany responded with repressions and discrimination of Poles, and carried out arrests of Polish activists and searches of Polish homes, etc., however in 1920 Rumia was successfully restored to the newly re-established Polish state. Administratively it was part of the new Pomeranian Voivodeship.

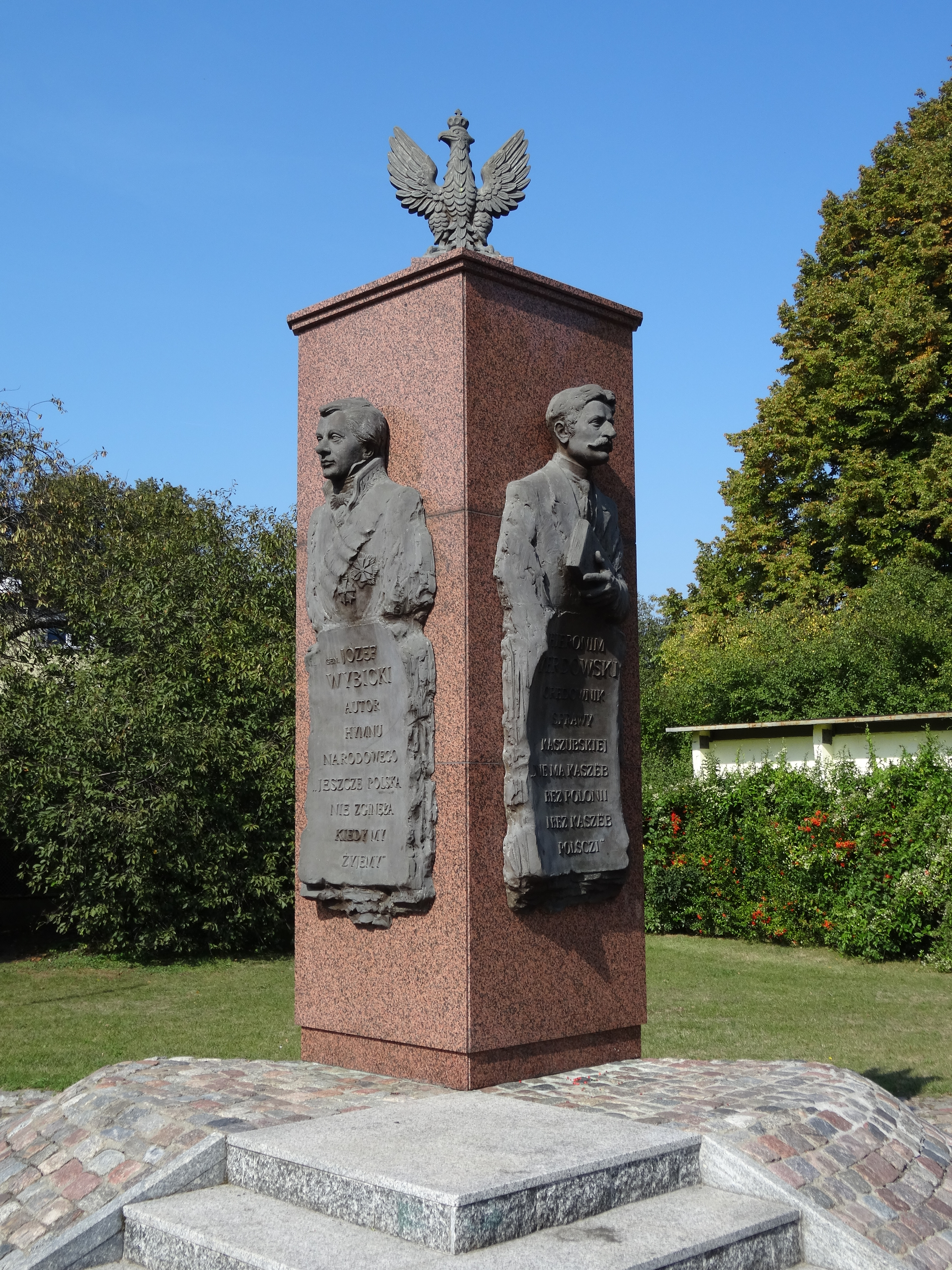
Monument to Józef Wybicki and Hieronim Derdowski

In the late 1920s, the nearby village of Gdynia was developed into a city and one of the biggest seaports in the region – especially due to its strategic location on the Polish coastal region, to which Rumia also belonged. The rapid growth of the city of Gdynia prompted the price of land to increase. Labour migrants from other parts of Poland began to settle in the region including the village of Rumia and its vicinity. Zagórze, Kazimierz and Łężyce, which are today parts of Rumia, were originally separate villages, and were joined with Rumia in 1934 to form the Rumia Rural Commune. By 1934, Rumia had become a suburb of Gdynia (population of 12,000 in 1939), located approximately 10 km (6 mi) from the city centre and well-connected with it through a railway link. A small military airfield, home of two squadrons of the Coast Defence Escadrille (based in Puck) was opened to civilian planes on 1 May 1936. The airport serviced international route Gdynia-Copenhagen and domestic route Gdynia-Warsaw and by 1 January 1939, the number of passengers using it rose to over 3000 a year. The airfield was also the main base of the Gdynia-based glider club.

During the German invasion of Poland in 1939, which started World War II, Rumia was a site of heavy fighting. It was a flanking position of the main Polish defence line at Kępa Oksywska. Two military cemeteries are located in the area. Soldiers of the 207th Infantry Division (Wehrmacht) and SS members murdered 18 people in Rumia 11–12 September 1939. Afterwards the town was occupied by Nazi Germany, which annexed it to the newly formed province of Reichsgau Danzig-West Prussia and renamed it to Rahmel. In September and October 1939, SS and SD terrorized ethnic Polish and Jewish population. Most of the victims were either executed at a nearby mass execution site in Piaśnica or sent to the Stutthof concentration camp. Pre-war wójt of Rumia (head of the local administration) Hipolit Roszczynialski was among the victims of the massacres in Piaśnica. Approximately half of the pre-war inhabitants of the town were expelled from 1939 to 1941, mostly to the General Government in the more eastern part of German-occupied Poland. Many were also deported to forced labour near Szczecin. The town was also a place of internment for several thousand POWs, mostly from the United Kingdom, France and Italy. A forced labour camp and an aircraft assembly plant were located in the town's vicinity. The Polish resistance conducted sabotage and espionage of German activity in Rumia. In 1945, shortly before the town's liberation by the Red Army, the local airfield was destroyed by an RAF bombing raid.

In 1945, the town was transferred back to the once again reestablished Pomeranian Voivodeship. Rumia became a city in 1954 when a few other villages (Zagórze, Biała Rzeka, Szmelta and Janowo) were joined in. The town was administratively part of the Gdańsk Voivodeship from 1975 to 1998. In 2001, the nearby village of Kazimierz was also included into city of Rumia.

== Transport ==
Rumia is well connected through a 2-lane highway that leads from Wejherowo to Gdynia and from there by Circular Highway to Gdańsk. There is a plan to extend the Circular from Gdynia to beyond Wejherowo.

The Szybka Kolej Miejska (Urban Fast Train) makes two stops in the city, connecting it to Wejherowo, Gdynia, and beyond. The stops are Rumia and Rumia Janowo. There is also network of city buses that also offers connections to Wejherowo and Gdynia.

== Sports ==
Football team Orkan Rumia and rugby team Arka Rumia are based in the city.

Historical population
Year	Pop.	±%
1960	15,100	—
1970	23,300	+54.3%
1975	26,000	+11.6%
1980	26,700	+2.7%
1990	37,500	+40.4%
1995	40,000	+6.7%
1998	40,200	+0.5%
2005	44,900	+11.7%
2012	47,148	+5.0%
2019	49,160	+4.3%
Note: 2010 2014 2017

== People from Rumia ==
- Erika Steinbach (born 1943) a German CDU politician, served in the Bundestag 1990-2017
- Jerzy Treder (1942–2015) a Polish philologist and linguist, focusing on Kashubian studies
- Magdalena Damaske (born 1996) a Polish volleyball player

== International relations ==
Rumia is twinned with:

Hultsfreds, Sweden	Le Creusot, France

== See also ==
- Polish areas annexed by Nazi Germany
- Treatment of the Polish citizens by the occupiers
- World War II atrocities in Poland
