= Reda, Poland =

City in Kashubia

Reda Réda
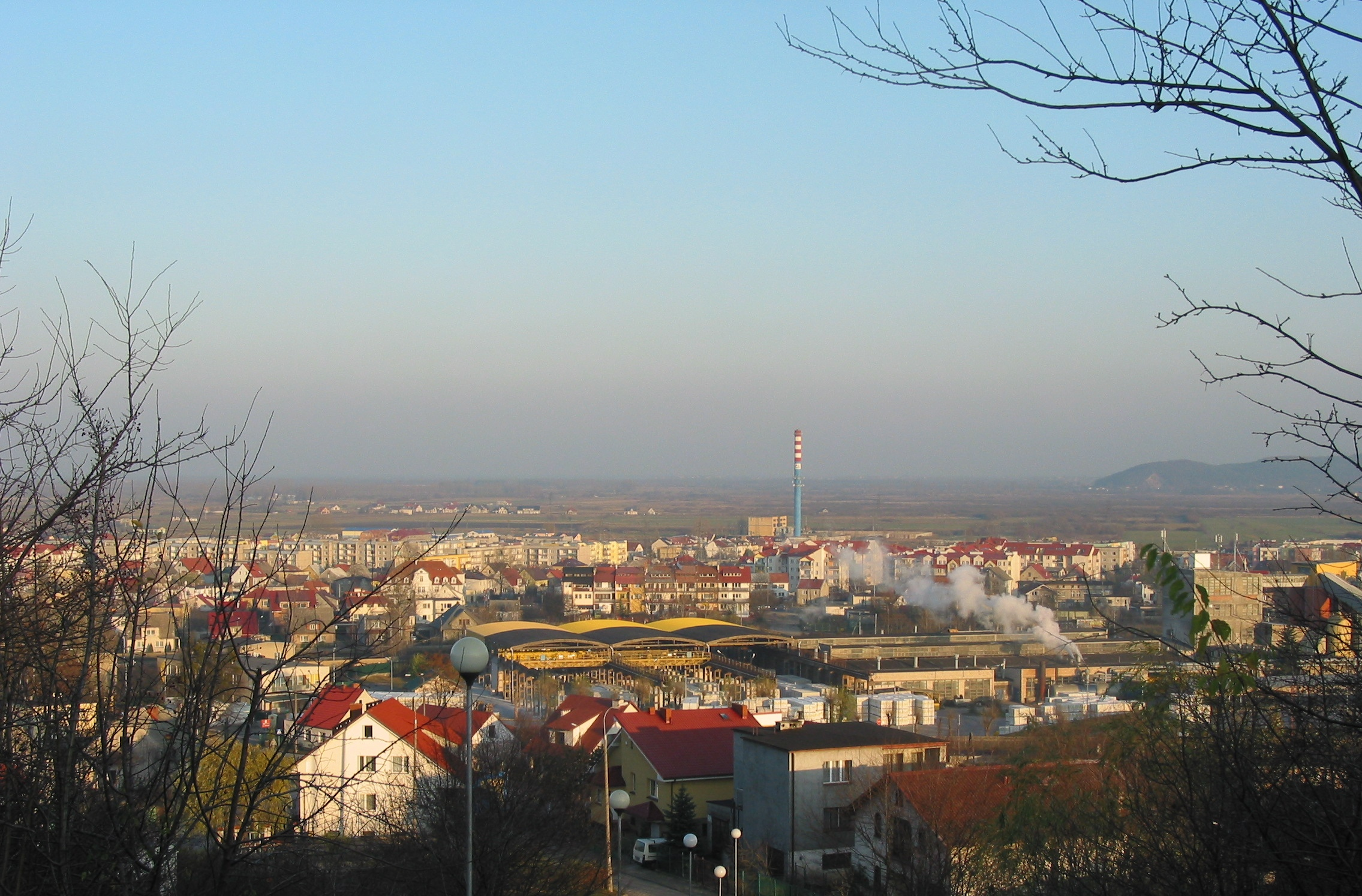
- General view of Reda

- Flag Coat of arms

- Location within Poland
- Coordinates: 54°37′N 18°21′E
- Country: Poland
- Voivodeship: Pomeranian
- County: Wejherowo
- Gmina: Reda (urban gmina)

Area
  - Total: 29.45 km^{2} (11.37 sq mi)

Population (2023)
  - Total: 28,588
  - Density: 970.7/km^{2} (2,514/sq mi)
- Time zone: UTC+1 (CET)
  - Summer (DST): UTC+2 (CEST)
- Postal code: 84-240
- Vehicle registration: GWE
- Website: www.reda.pl

Reda ([ˈrɛda]; Kashubian: Réda; formerly German: Rheda) is a town on the Reda River in northern Poland, in the Kashubia region in Pomerania, with approx. 28,000 inhabitants. It is part of Wejherowo County, Pomeranian Voivodeship.

It is part of the Little Kashubian Tricity urban area, along with Wejherowo (which it borders in the west), and Rumia (which it borders in the south). The urban area is adjacent to the Tricity, which along with other surrounding areas form an agglomeration home to over 1 million residents on the Baltic coast of Gdańsk Bay. Well-developed railways and highways connect Reda to the Tricity.

== Population ==
Historical population

Year	Pop.	±% p.a.
1768	74	—
1869	692	+2.24%
1872	763	+3.31%
1924	1,000	+0.52%
1968	5,400	+3.91%
1982	6,091	+0.86%

Year	Pop.	±% p.a.
1991	14,000	+9.69%
1999	17,200	+2.61%
2001	17,634	+1.25%
2011	22,030	+2.25%
2019	26,011	+2.10%
2023	28,588	+2.39%

== History ==
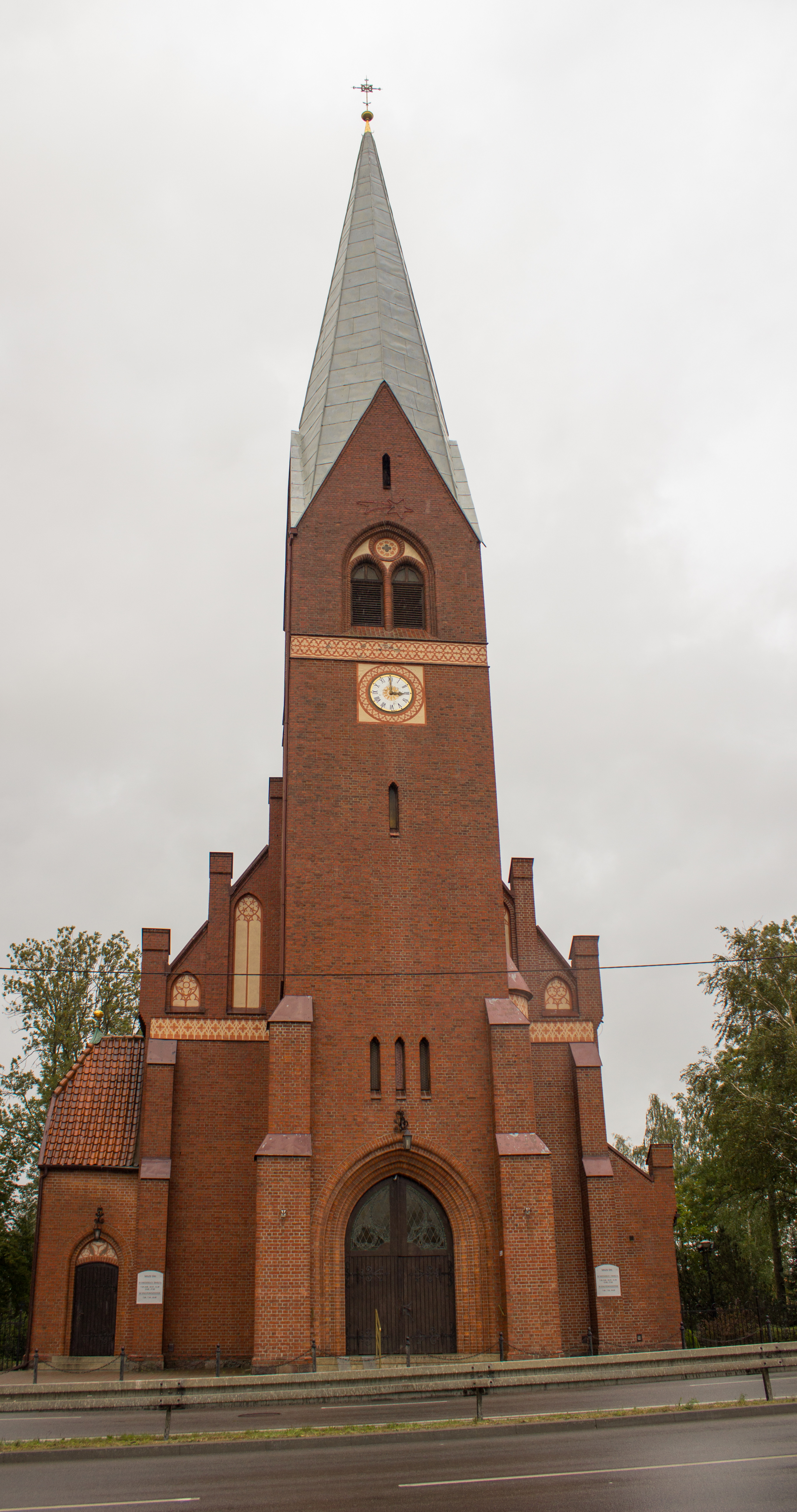
Church Of The Assumption Of The Blessed Virgin Mary

Slavic Lechitic settlements were established in present-day districts of Ciechocino and Pieleszewo in the Early Middle Ages. The territory of Gdańsk Pomerania formed part of Poland since the establishment of the state in the 10th century. A wooden church existed at the site since the 12th century. In 1309, the area was annexed by the State of the Teutonic Order. It was first mentioned in documents in 1357. The area was re-incorporated to the Kingdom of Poland in 1454 by King Casimir IV Jagiellon, and after the subsequent Thirteen Years' War the Teutonic Knights renounced any claims in 1466. Reda and present-day districts Ciechocino and Pieleszewo were royal villages of the Polish Crown, administratively located in the Puck County in the Pomeranian Voivodeship in the province of Royal Prussia in the Greater Poland Province. In 1768, Ernest Konopacki obtained permission from the King of Poland Stanisław August Poniatowski to build a brass products factory.

Reda was lost to Prussia for nearly 150 years through the First Partition of Poland of 1772, and from 1871 to 1920 it was also part of Germany. In the late 19th century, the local populace was still predominantly Polish, and Catholic in confession. Following World War I, in November 1918 Poland regained independence, and local Poles began preparations to rejoin Poland. A Polish council was established and a Polish rally took place on December 26, 1918. Germany responded with repressions of Poles, however in January 1920 Reda was successfully restored to Poland.

During the invasion of Poland, which started World War II, the Germans captured Reda on September 9, 1939. It was annexed from Poland by Germany into the latter's newly established Danzig-West Prussia province. Reda was liberated by Polish troops on March 12, 1945. After the war, the town was again returned to Poland. In 1967, when Reda was inhabited by 5,400 people, it was granted town rights, and after growth began to accelerate in 1982, its population had more than tripled to above 17,000 residents by 1999. It was administratively part of the Gdańsk Voivodeship from 1975 to 1998.

== Transport ==
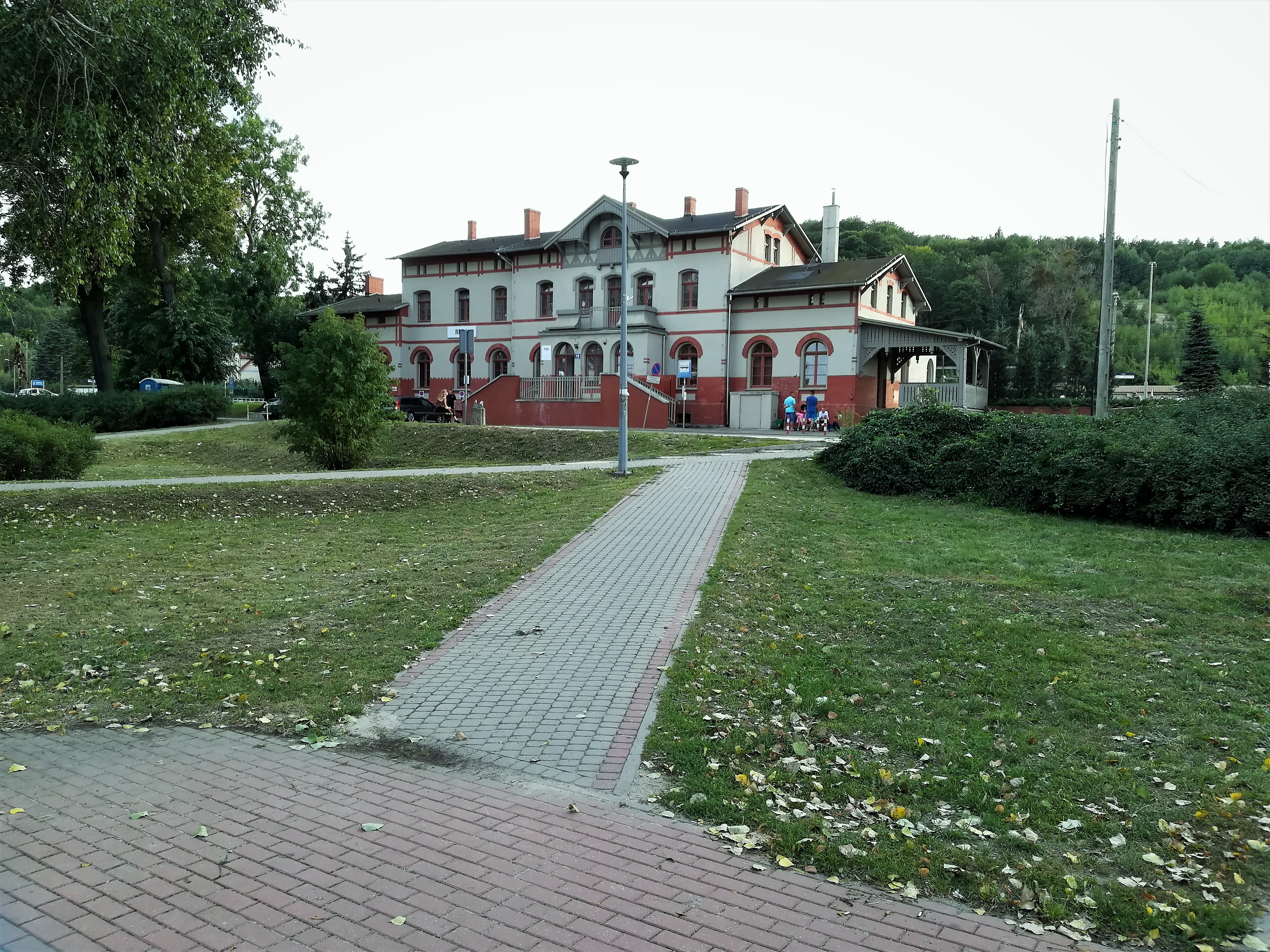
Reda railway station

The Reda, Reda Pieleszewo, Reda Rekowo railway stations are located in Reda.

== Sports ==
The local football team is Orlęta Reda. It competes in the lower leagues.

== See also ==
- Reda River
