= Mrzezino =

- Village
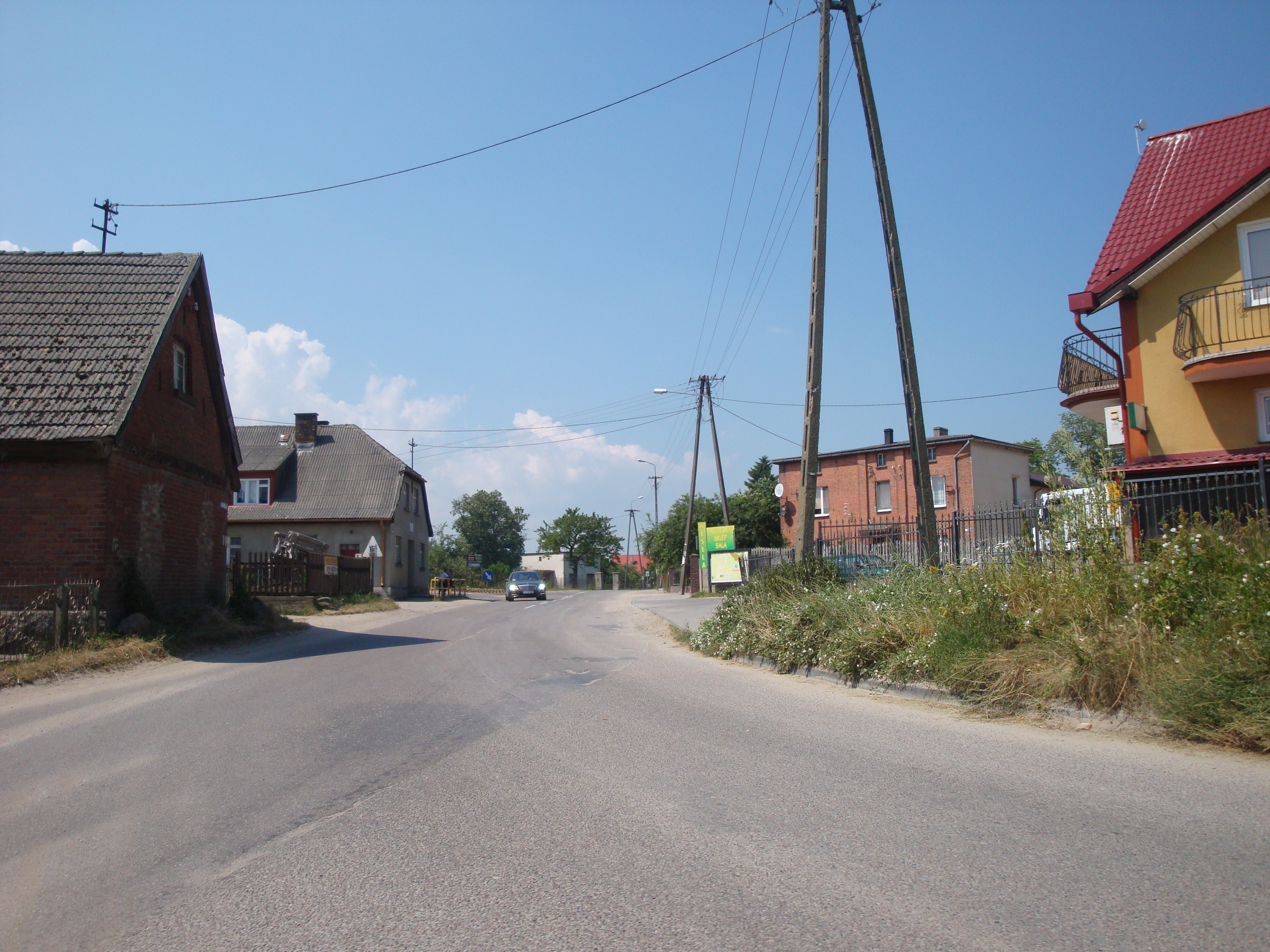

- Location within Poland
- Coordinates: 54°39′8″N 18°25′1″E
- Country: Poland
- Voivodeship: Pomeranian
- County: Puck
- Gmina: Puck
- Population: 2,210
- Time zone: UTC+1 (CET)
  - Summer (DST): UTC+2 (CEST)
- Vehicle registration: GPU

Mrzezino ([mʐɛˈʑinɔ]; German: Bresin, 1942–45 Brambusch) is a village in the administrative district of Gmina Puck, within Puck County, Pomeranian Voivodeship, in northern Poland. It is located within the ethnocultural region of Kashubia in the historic region of Pomerania.

== History ==
Mrzezino was a royal village of the Polish Crown, administratively located in the Puck County in the Pomeranian Voivodeship.

During the German occupation of Poland (World War II), local teachers were among Polish teachers murdered in the Mauthausen concentration camp (see Intelligenzaktion), and 19 Poles were expelled and deported to forced labour.
