= Wejherowo railway station =

Railway station in Wejherowo, Poland

Wejherowo
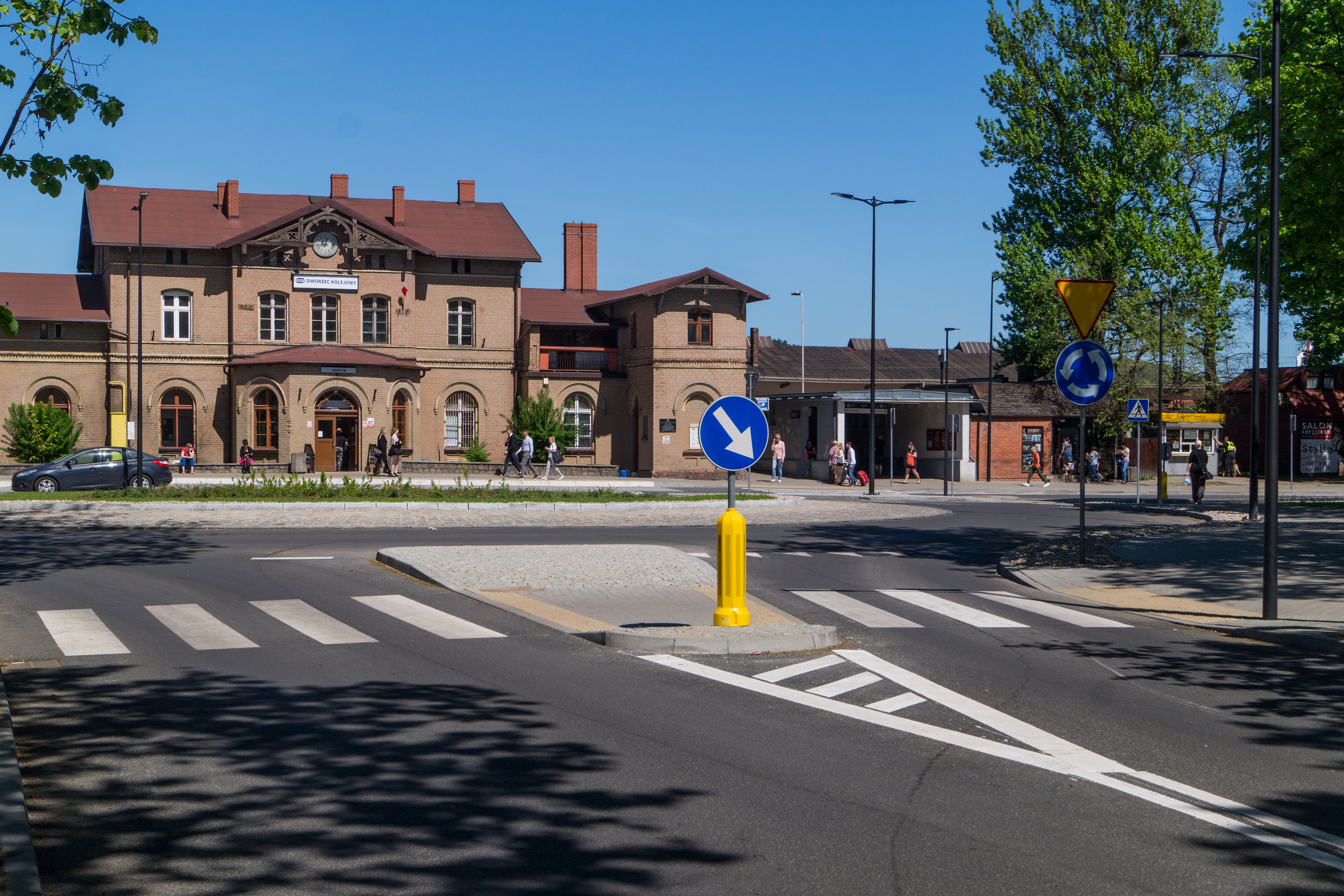
- Wejherowo railway station

General information
- Location: Wejherowo, Pomeranian Voivodeship; Poland
- System: Railway Station
- Operator: PKP Polskie Linie Kolejowe
- Lines: 202: Gdańsk Główny–Stargard railway 230: Wejherowo–Garczegorze railway (closed)
- Platforms: 3
- Tracks: 6

History
- Opened: 1870; 156 years ago
Location
- Location within Poland

Wejherowo railway station is a railway station serving the town of Wejherowo, in the Pomeranian Voivodeship, Poland. The station opened in 1870 and is located on the Gdańsk–Stargard railway. The train services are operated by PKP, Polregio and SKM Tricity.

At the time of building, the station was named after the German name of the town, Neustadt (Westpreußen), which was reused later under Nazi occupation. The station used to be a junction for the now closed Wejherowo–Garczegorze railway.

== Train services ==
The station is served by the following services:

- Intercity services (IC) Łódź Fabryczna — Warszawa — Gdańsk Główny — Kołobrzeg
- Intercity services (IC) Szczecin - Koszalin - Słupsk - Gdynia - Gdańsk
- Intercity services (IC) Szczecin - Koszalin - Słupsk - Gdynia - Gdańsk - Elbląg/Iława - Olsztyn
- Intercity services (IC) Szczecin - Koszalin - Słupsk - Gdynia - Gdańsk - Elbląg - Olsztyn - Białystok
- Intercity services (TLK) Kołobrzeg — Gdynia Główna — Warszawa Wschodnia — Kraków Główny
- Regional services (R) Tczew — Słupsk
- Regional services (R) Malbork — Słupsk
- Regional services (R) Elbląg — Słupsk
- Regional services (R) Słupsk — Bydgoszcz Główna
- Regional services (R) Luzino — Gdynia Główna
- Regional services (R) Słupsk — Gdynia Główna
- Szybka Kolej Miejska services (SKM) (Lębork -) Wejherowo - Reda - Rumia - Gdynia - Sopot - Gdańsk

Preceding station	PKP Intercity	Following station
Lębork towards Kołobrzeg	IC	Rumia towards Łódź Fabryczna
Lębork towards Szczecin Główny	IC	Rumia towards Gdańsk Główny
Lębork towards Szczecin Główny	IC	Rumia towards Olsztyn Główny
Lębork towards Szczecin Główny	IC	Rumia towards Białystok
Lębork towards Kołobrzeg	TLK	Rumia towards Kraków Główny
Preceding station	Polregio	Following station
Gościcino Wejherowskie towards Słupsk	PR	Reda towards Tczew
Gościcino Wejherowskie towards Słupsk	PR	Reda towards Malbork
Gościcino Wejherowskie towards Słupsk	PR	Reda towards Elbląg
Gościcino Wejherowskie towards Słupsk	PR	Reda towards Smętowo, Laskowice Pomorskie, or Bydgoszcz Główna
Gościcino Wejherowskie towards Luzino or Słupsk	PR	Reda towards Gdynia Główna
Preceding station	SKM Tricity	Following station
Terminus	SKM Tricity	Wejherowo Nanice towards Gdańsk Śródmieście
Gościcino Wejherowskie towards Lębork	SKM Tricity	Wejherowo Nanice towards Gdańsk Śródmieście
