= Władysławowo railway station =

Railway station in Władysławowo, Poland

Władysławowo
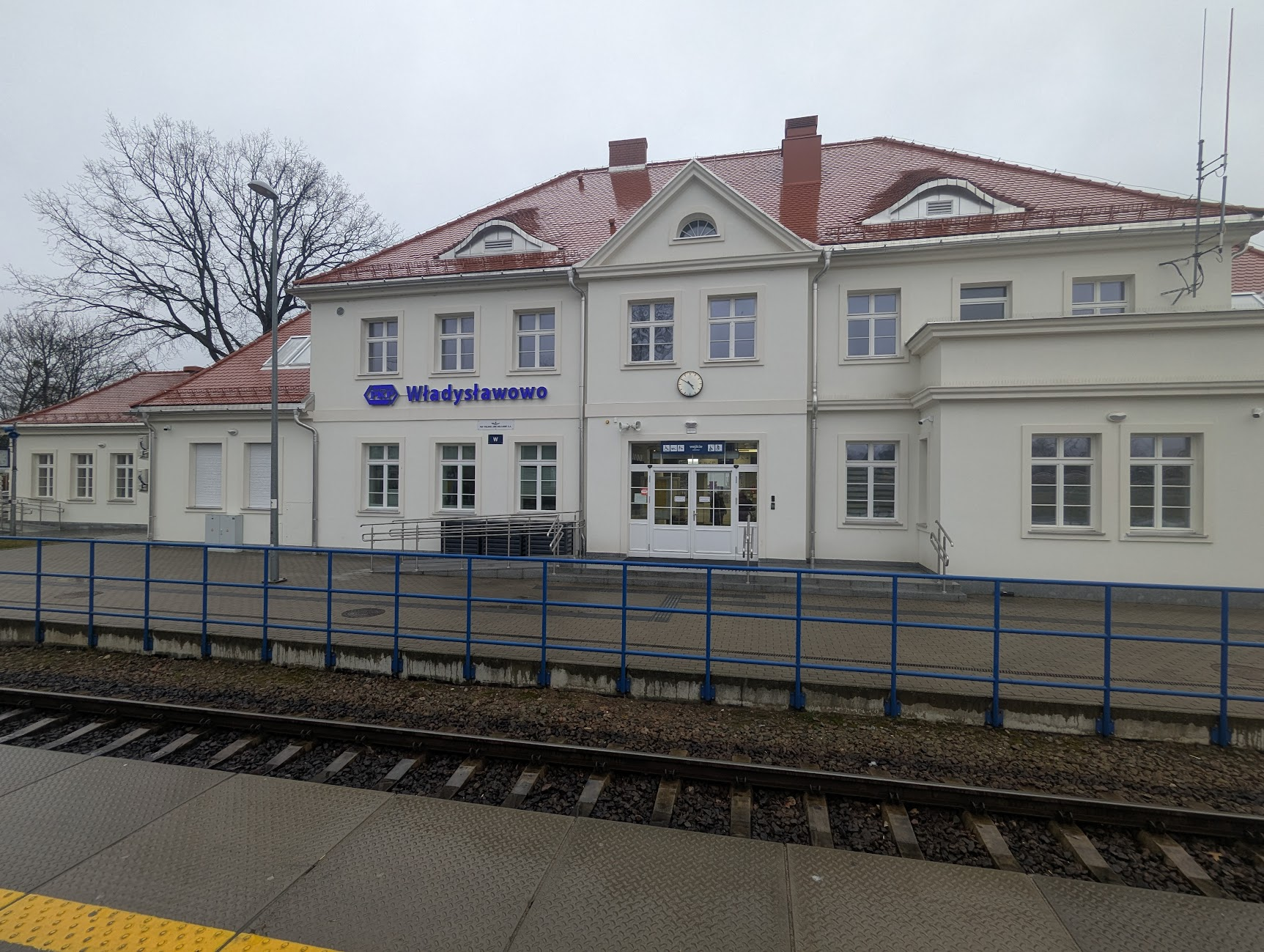
- Władysławowo railway station

General information
- Location: Władysławowo, Pomeranian Voivodeship; Poland
- System: Railway Station
- Operator: PKP Polskie Linie Kolejowe
- Line: 213: Reda–Hel railway
- Platforms: 1
- Tracks: 3

History
- Opened: 16 September 1922; 103 years ago
- Rebuilt: 2014
Location
- Location within Poland

Władysławowo railway station is a railway station serving the town of Władysławowo, in the Pomeranian Voivodeship, Poland. The station opened in 1922 and is located on the Reda–Hel railway. The train services are operated by Polregio.

The station used to be known as Wielka Wieś Hallerowo and Großendorf (Westpreußen).

== Modernisation ==
The station was rebuilt in 2014 as part of the modernisation of the Reda–Hel railway.

== Train services ==
The station is served by the following services:

- Regional services (R) Władysławowo - Reda - Gdynia Główna
- Regional services (R) Hel - Władysławowo - Reda - Gdynia Główna

During the summer months long-distance services also operate to/from Hel.

| Preceding station | Polregio | Following station |
|---|---|---|
| Terminus | PR | Swarzewo towards Gdynia Główna |
| Władysławowo Port towards Hel | PR | Swarzewo towards Gdynia Główna |
