= Hel railway station =

Railway station in Hel, Poland

Hel
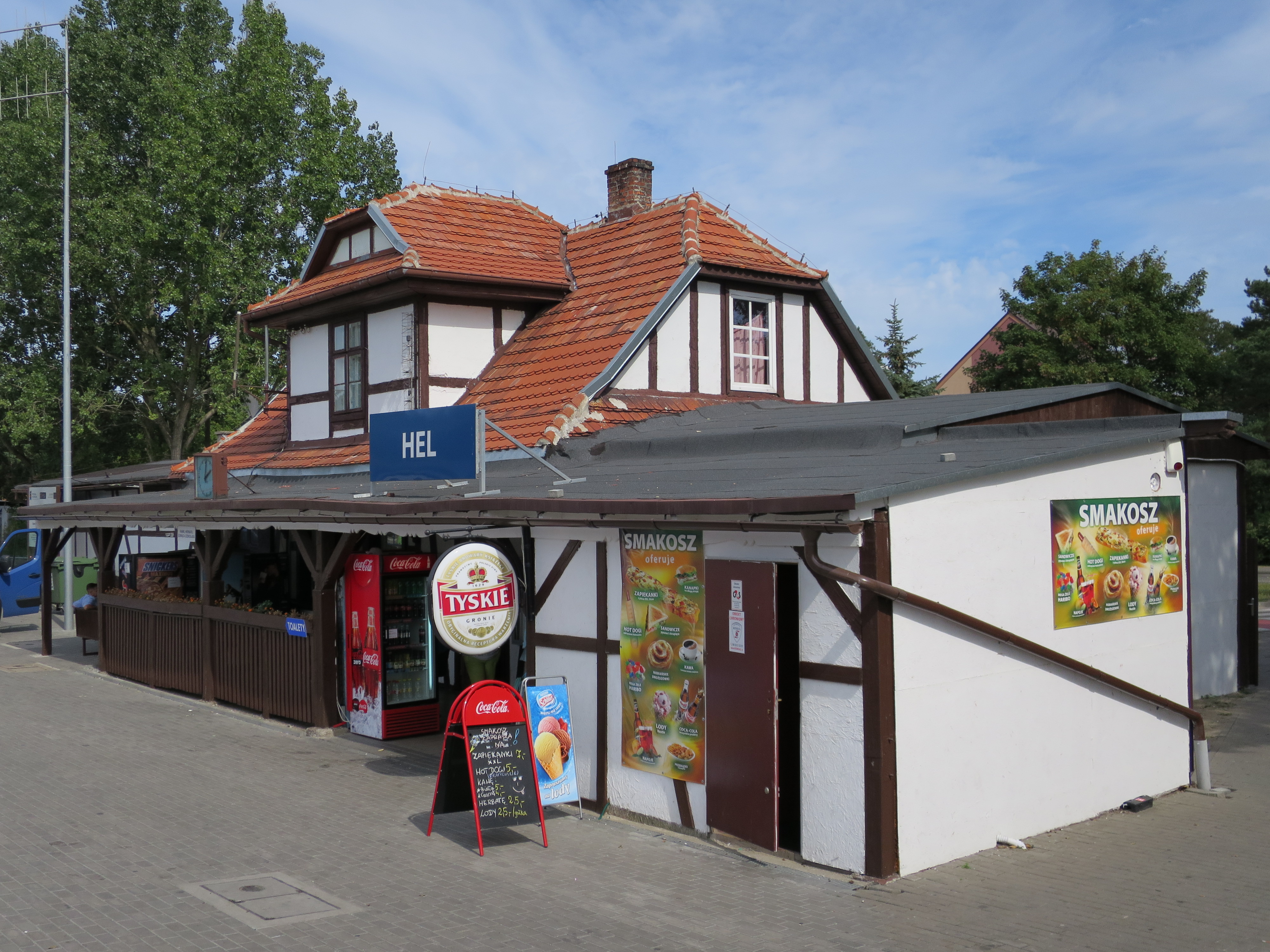
- Hel railway station

General information
- Location: Hel, Pomeranian Voivodeship; Poland
- System: Railway Station
- Operator: PKP Polskie Linie Kolejowe
- Line: 213: Reda–Hel railway
- Platforms: 2
- Tracks: 4

History
- Opened: 1922; 104 years ago
- Rebuilt: 2015
Location
- Location within Poland Location within Hel, Poland

The Hel railway station is a railway station serving the town of Hel, in the Pomeranian Voivodeship, Poland. The station opened in 1922 and is located on the Reda–Hel railway. The train services are operated by Polregio.

== Modernisation ==
The station was rebuilt during 2015 as part of the modernisation of the Reda–Hel railway.

== Train services ==
The station is served by the following services:

- Regional services (R) Hel - Władysławowo - Reda - Gdynia Główna

During the summer months long-distance services also operate to/from Hel.

Preceding station	Polregio	Following station
Terminus	PR	Jurata towards Gdynia Główna

== Gallery ==
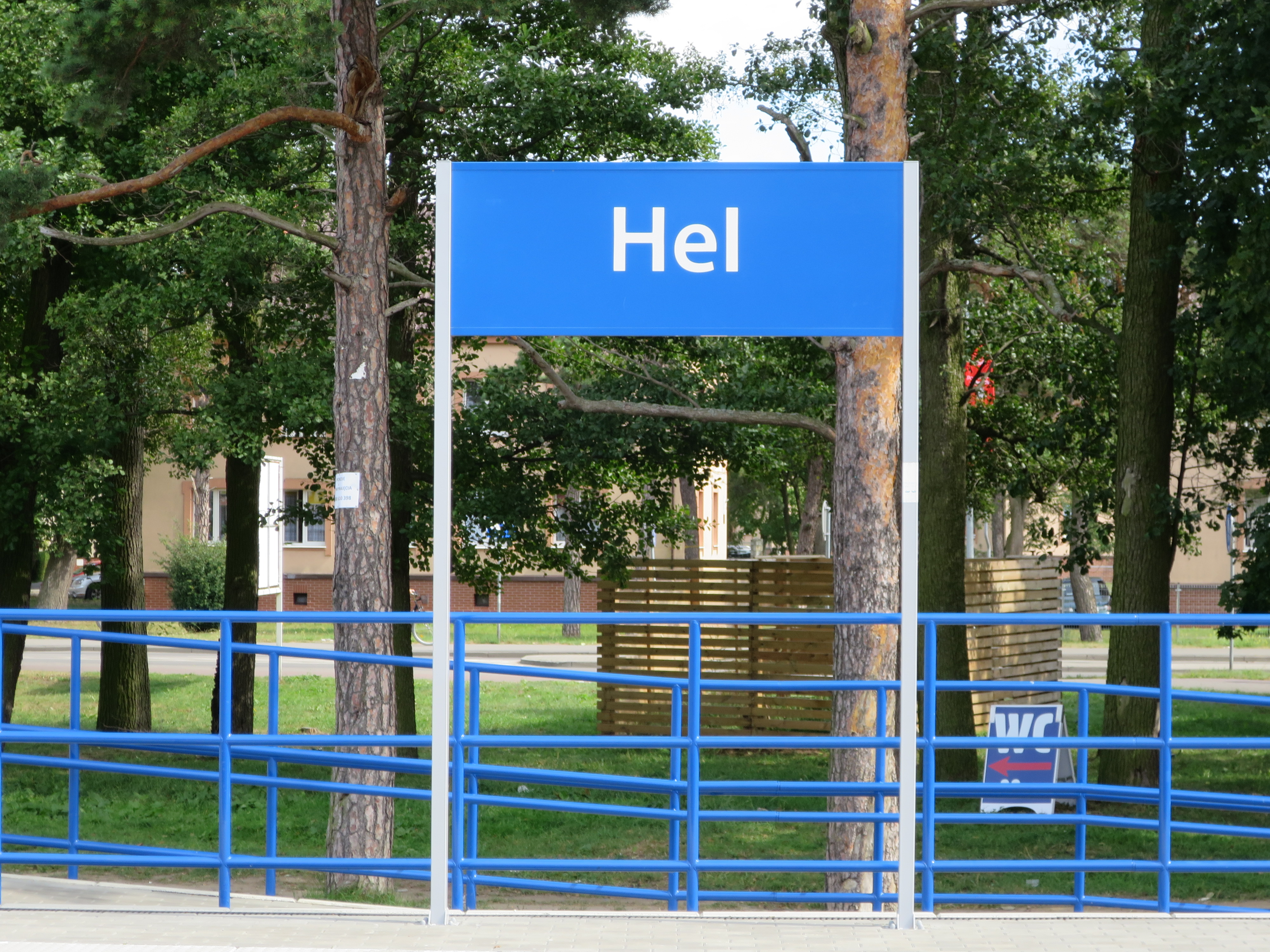

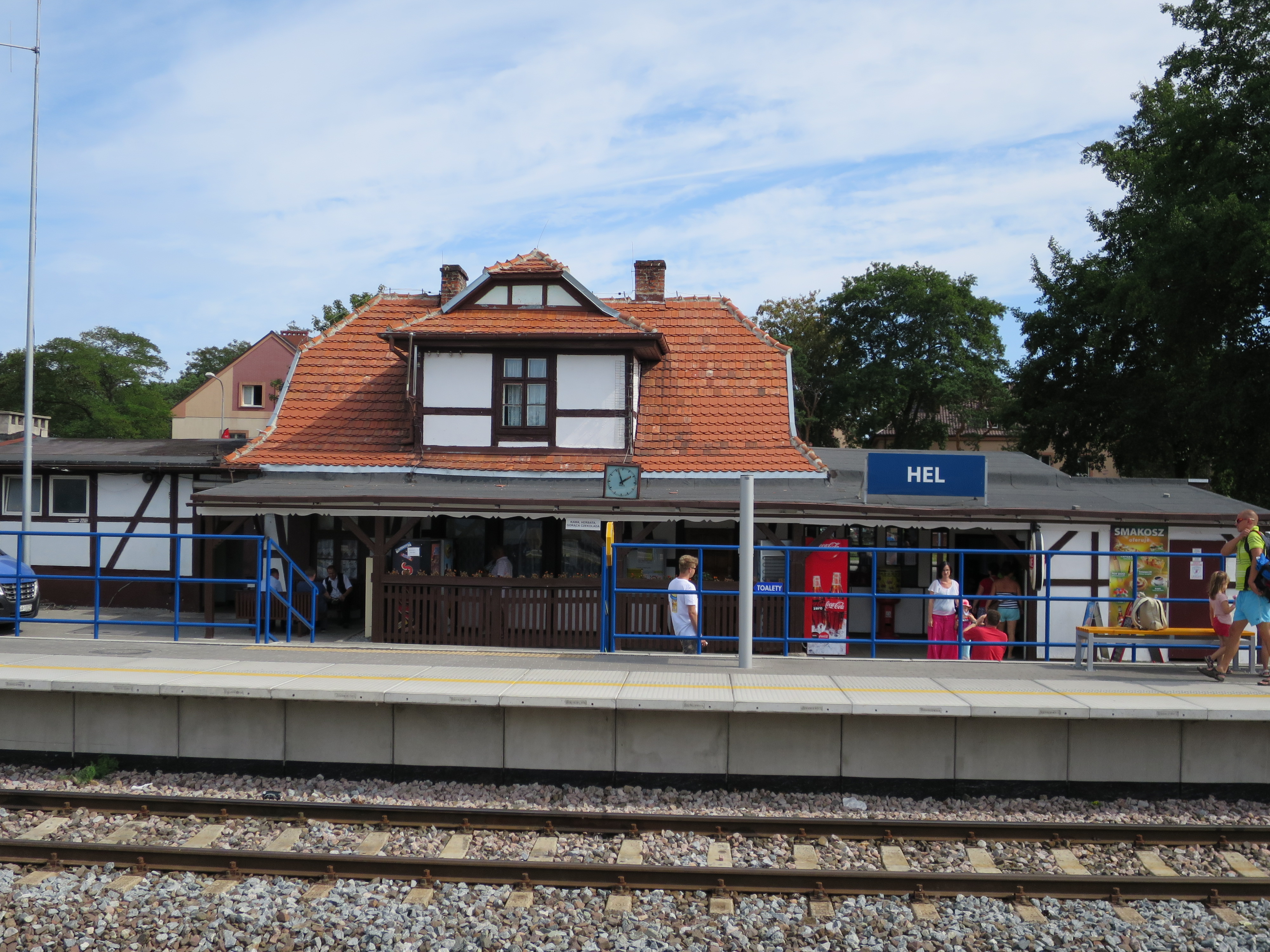
