= Reda–Hel railway =

Railway line in Poland

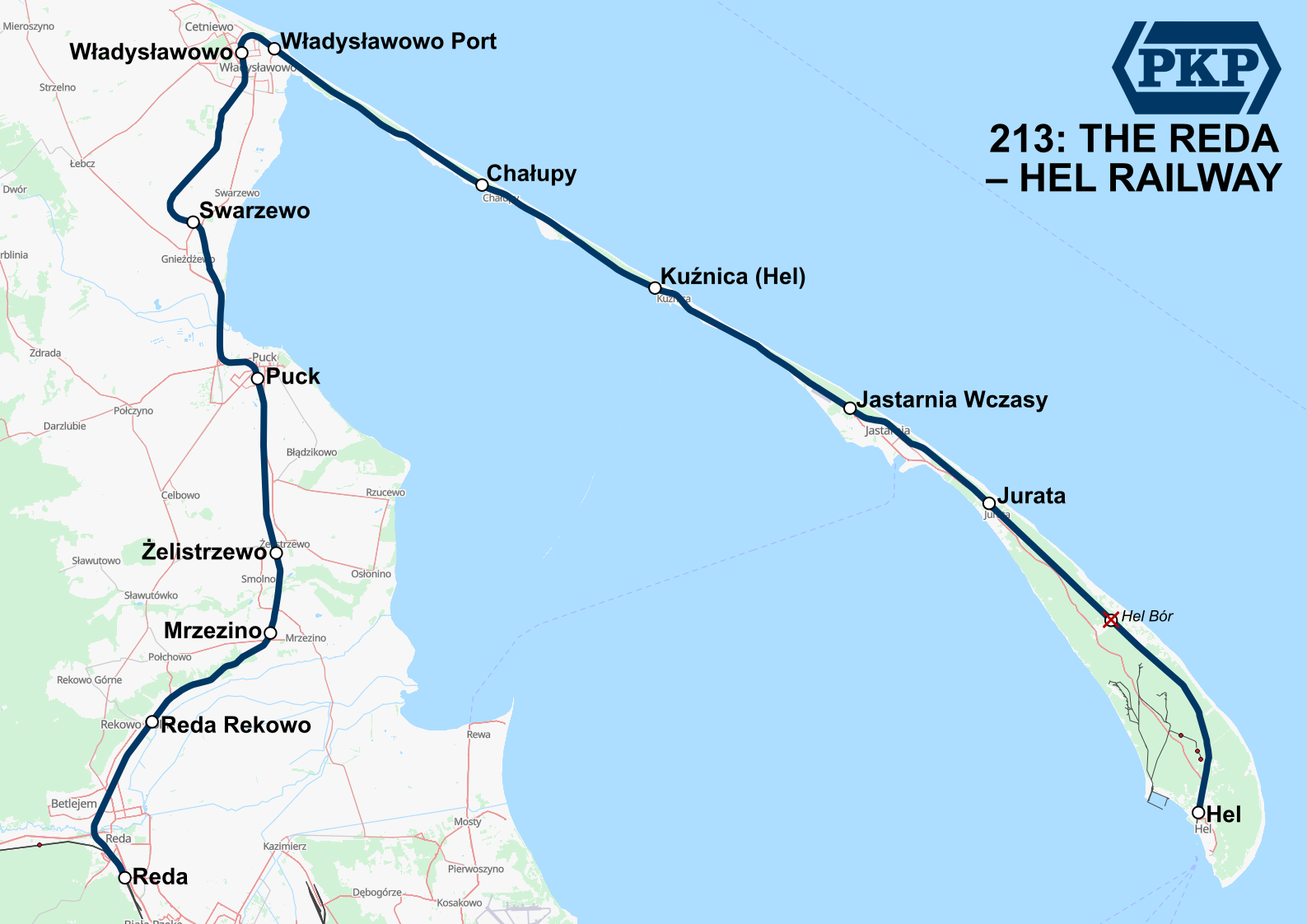

Overview
- Status: in use
- Locale: Poland
- Termini: Reda; Hel

Service
- Type: Heavy rail
- Route number: 213

History
- Opened: 1879

Technical
- Line length: 62 km (39 mi)
- Track gauge: 1,435 mm (4 ft 8 1/2 in) standard gauge
- Electrification: no
- Operating speed: 100 km/h (62 mph)

The Reda–Hel railway is a 62-kilometre-long (39 mi) Polish railway line, that connects the Hel Peninsula with Reda and Gdynia. The railway is located in the northern part of the Pomeranian Voivodeship.

The line is single-track and non-electrified.

== Opening ==
This is the only standard gauge railway line built on the spit. The line was created in stages from 1879 to 1928. Construction of the final stretch of the line started in 1922 was opened in 1928. Part of the line at the port of Hel was later demolished.

== Closure ==
In Swarzewo was the only railway junction on the route (other than the one at Reda where the line begins) with the Swarzewo–Krokowa railway which closed in 1991. For the third time rail traffic from Puck to Krokowa it was suspended in the late 80s and early 90s in May 1989 on this route ceased to run passenger trains, and in 1991 also marks

In March 2001, thanks to the intervention and funding the local government of Pomerania line was saved from closure.

== Modernisation ==
On 26 September 1993 the last scheduled steam passenger train operated along the line.

In 1998 the line was modernised. Stations have been equipped with a remotely controlled traffic centre from Gdynia, so that the presence of service stations along the route (in addition to the ticket offices) became redundant.

In 2005, to support local connections between Gdynia and Hel began to be use railcars and diesel multiple units manufactured by PESA SA. In 2006, these vehicles took over all the services on the line. In the summer season due to the increasing number of travellers, locomotive hauled trains are also used.

On 5 October 2011 an agreement with Salcef Costruzioni edili E Ferroviaria for the revitalization of the entire line No. 213 was signed. Modernisation of the line included improving the track, the platforms and renovating buildings. The speed was increased to 100 km/h (62 mph) with the exception of the Puck-Wladyslawowo section, where the speed is 90 km/h (56 mph). This was to shorten the travel time by 15 to 25 minutes. Renovation began in spring of 2012 and resulted in the temporary closure of the line until 10 September 2012. Due to increased transportation during the holiday season, train traffic was reinstated during the summer of 2013. In the period from 2 September 2013 to 14 June 2014 traffic on the line was again suspended. The next closure took place on between 15 and 19 November 2014. On 4 to 11 May 2015 traffic on the route Władysławowo - Hel was again stopped. Modernisation was finally completed in July 2015. With the execution of the planned works travel time between Reda and Hel has been shortened by 17 minutes.

== Usage ==
Due to the number of tourists to the area the line has high variations through the seasons, therefore two timetables exist for the line depending on the season. The line is used year-round by regional services between Gdynia, Reda and Hel.

Long-distance trains only operate during the summer holidays due to the influx of tourists to the Hel Peninsula. Then, this route runs several pairs of express trains from other parts of Poland. These trains are hauled by diesel locomotives from Gdynia.

There is little freight traffic along the line due to a lack in industry.

== See also ==
- Railway lines of Poland
