= PKP Polskie Linie Kolejowe =

Polish railway infrastructure manager

PKP Polskie Linie Kolejowe S.A.
- Type: JSC
- Industry: Rail transport
- Founded: 1 October 2001
- Headquarters: Warsaw, Poland
- Key people: Piotr Wyborski; CEO; Jakub Majewski; Chairman of the supervisory board
- Services: Rail line construction Rail traffic control
- Revenue: 5.717 billion zł ▲ (2017)
- Net income: 15.14 million zł ▲ (2017)
- Total assets: 53.229 billion zł ▲ (2017)
- Number of employees: 40 276 (2022)
- Divisions: Railway Security Guard
- Website: www.plk-sa.pl

PKP Polskie Linie Kolejowe S.A. ('PKP Polish Railway Lines'; PKP PLK) is the Polish railway infrastructure manager, responsible for maintenance of rail tracks, conducting trains across the country, scheduling train timetables, and management of railway land.

The company was founded in 2001 as part of the break-up of the once-unitary Polish State Railways JSC, to separate infrastructure management and transport operations.

== Activities ==
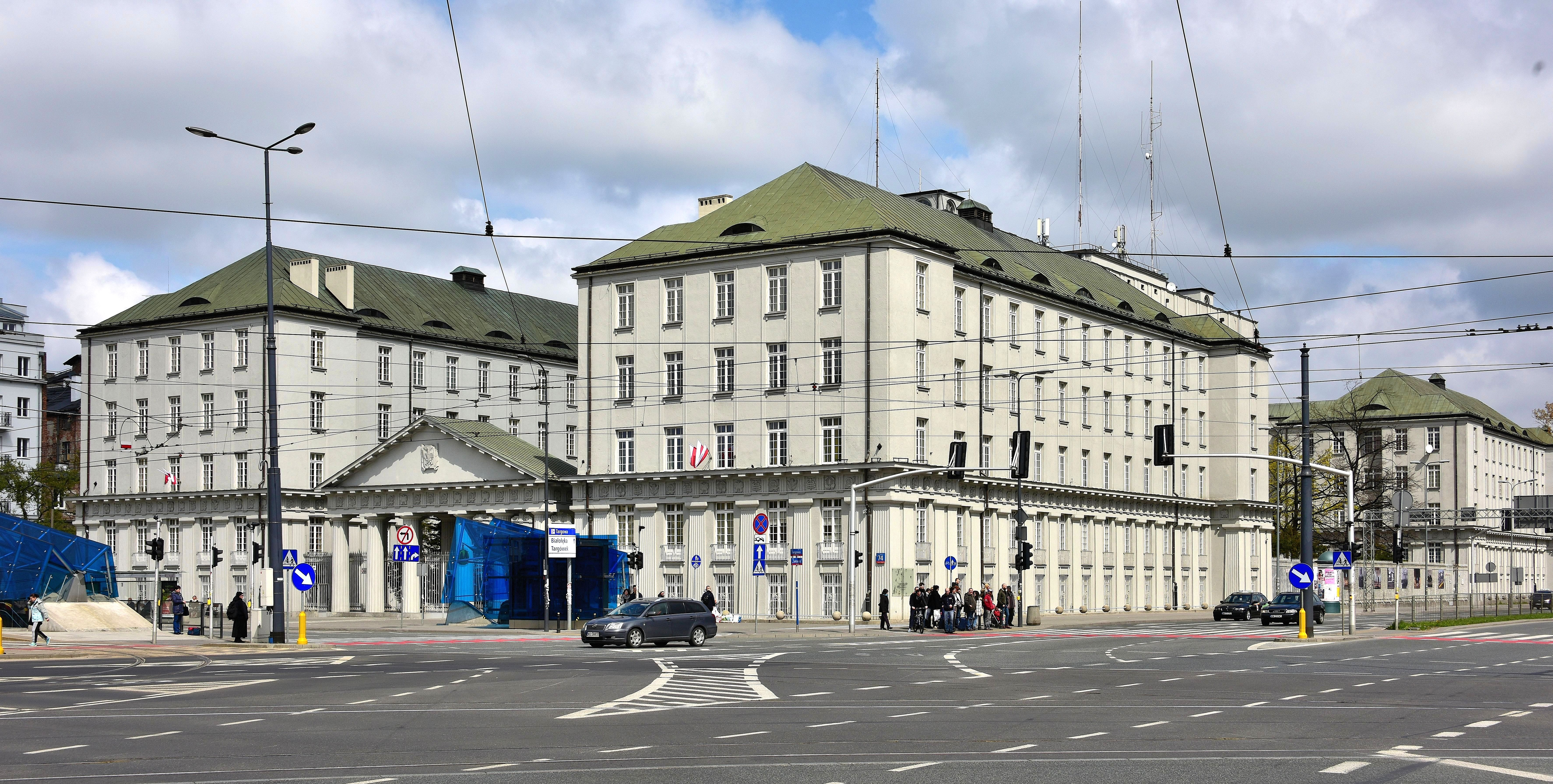
Headquarters at the former State Railways Directorate in Warsaw.

During 2000, a substantial restructuring of Polish railways in favour of a liberalised model permission of private operators and external participate, was enacted, one result of which was the creation of PKP Polskie Linie Kolejowe S.A. as Poland's new railway infrastructure manager in place of the unified Polish State Railways JSC. The approach of these reforms were largely similar to those being implemented across most of the member nations of the European Union (EU). PKP Polskie Linie Kolejowe did not inherit all infrastructure-related aspects of the former Polish State Railways, those that directly dealt with construction works were intentionally kept apart, and were partially privatised as separate entities. Instead, the new infrastructure management organisation came to agreements with those contractors, as well other parties, on a competitive and fair basis in accordance with binding Public Procurement Law; the treatment of all bidder and the overall bidding procedure were monitored as a precaution against irregularities by the Polish government. As a result, many international contractors from across the EU secured work on Poland's railways over the following years.

In 2006, Poland’s Council of Ministers approved the adoption of the Infrastructure and Environment for 2007-2013 operational programme, under which PKP Polskie Linie Kolejowe played a leading role in the modernisation of major portions of Poland's rail network during this timeframe. These works, costed at in excess of €36 billion and primarily funded by the European Union, sought to complete a high-speed railway network, raising the maximum speeds on several different lines to 200km/h, as well as to construct or modernise rail links to various major airports and international transport corridors.

During May 2010, it was announced that Bombardier Transportation had been awarded a contract to perform the first implementation of European Rail Traffic Management System (ERTMS) Level 2 technology in Poland. This initial deployment of the new signalling system was on a section of the E30 main line between Legnica, Wegliniec, and Bielawa and initially co-existed with the traditional signalling equipment already in situ. Multiple follow-on contracts covering various aspects of the project and other sections of the same line was issued over the following three years. During late 2015, it was announced that services using the new ETRMS section had commenced; at the time, Bombardier had a positive outlook towards delivering similar project in the country.

One of the benefits of the infrastructure modernisation and provision of higher line speeds was enabling PKP Intercity to launch operations of its New Pendolino high-speed trains between the Polish cities of Warsaw, Gdańsk, Wrocław, Krakow, and Katowice. Prior to the commissioning of ETCS Level 2 on the route, the maximum speed was restricted to 160km/h instead of 200km/h. These trains have been certified for operation at speeds of up to 250km/h in accordance with the relevant Technical Specifications for Interoperability (TSI), but such operations require suitable infrastructure to do so. Conventional services, both passenger and freight, have also been permitted to run faster when feasible to do so; another area of improvement is safety, which has been helped by the implementation of continuous digital communication and a reduction in grade crossings amongst other measures.

On 10 November 2015, the first phase of the North Sea – Baltic rail freight corridor was launched; it is intended to increase rail freight traffic between the most important North Sea ports with Central Europe and the Baltic States, with the new rail freight line interconnecting with the wider pan-European network to do so. Funding for the upgrading of Poland’s railway infrastructure along the Trans-European Transport Network (TEN-T) North Sea–Baltic Corridor has been provided by the European Investment Bank.

In early 2018, a five-year contract was signed between Nokia, Herkules, Pozbud, WASKO, and PKP Polskie Linie Kolejowe for the deployment of a 13,800km GSM-R radio network and a 11,000km mission-critical backhaul network across Poland's railways. The scheme, which has been largely financed by the European Union alongside contributions from the Polish government, will create one of the largest modern railway communications networks and is a key component for ERTMS operations. Multiple contracts were also signed with Thales Group, a long term supplier of Poland's railways, around this time to design and deliver both signalling and railway traffic control systems, which includes the implementation of Level 2 European Train Control System (ETCS), upon multiple lines. During April 2021, a major milestone in the project was reached with the completion of work on the E65 line between Warsaw and Gdynia, permitting the implementation of 200km/h services along it.

Into the 2020s, PKP Polskie Linie Kolejowe has continued to study opportunities for improvements, such as increasing capacity around Katowice and raising line speeds between Szczecin Główny and the Polish-German border.

== See also ==
- Transportation in Poland
- List of railway companies
- Polish locomotives designation
- PKP Group
