= Tricity Rapid Urban Railway =

Transit system in Tricity, Poland

- Native name: Szybka Kolej Miejska w Trójmieście
- Type: Ltd.
- Industry: Rapid transit and commuter rail
- Founded: December 22, 2000 (as a separate company); 1951 (as a part of PKP)
- Headquarters: Gdynia, Poland
- Area served: Pomeranian Voivodeship
- Key people: Maciej Lignowski; CEO; Christopher Golubiewski; Chairman of the supervisory board
- Services: Passenger transport in Pomeranian Voivodeship; Maintenance of Gdańsk Śródmieście-Rumia railway line
- Revenue: 221.5 million zł▼ (2017)
- Operating income: 3.5 million zł▼ (2017)
- Net income: 2.6 million zł▼ (2017)
- Total assets: 455.7 million zł▲ (2017)
- Number of employees: 989 (2017)
- Parent: PKP Group
- Website: www.skm.pkp.pl

The Tricity Rapid Urban Railway (Polish: Szybka Kolej Miejska w Trójmieście Polish pronunciation: [ˈʂɨpka ˈkɔlɛi̯ ˈmjɛi̯ska]; SKM), is a public rapid transit and commuter rail system in Poland's Tricity area (Gdańsk, Sopot and Gdynia), in addition to servicing the Little Kashubian Tricity and Lębork 59 km (37 mi) west of Gdynia; its service extended in the past also to Słupsk, Pruszcz Gdański, Tczew, Elbląg, and as far south as Iława. Until December 2022, It serviced Kartuzy and Koscierzyna.

The SKM functions as a rapid transit and commuter rail service for the Tricity, operating frequent trains on the central section between Gdańsk and Gdynia, and less frequently to outlying sections. The SKM route has 27 stops covering the Tricity between Gdańsk, Gdynia and Wejherowo.

The SKM was established after World War II ended in 1945, when the cities of the Tricity, which had previously been divided under Polish and non-Polish administrations, all became part of Poland. For the first 24 years, from the start of SKM service in January 1952 until December 1976, SKM trains used cars built in the 1930s for the Berlin S-Bahn. These cars had been taken from Germany to Poland in 1945 as war reparations.

In December 1976 the Berlin cars were retired, and replaced by new ones constructed in Poland. In 2014, nearly one-third of the SKM fleet was completely rebuilt. An order for new cars was also on the horizon, and the SKM was entering a constant phase of modernization and improvement.

== Railway ==
=== Route and service ===
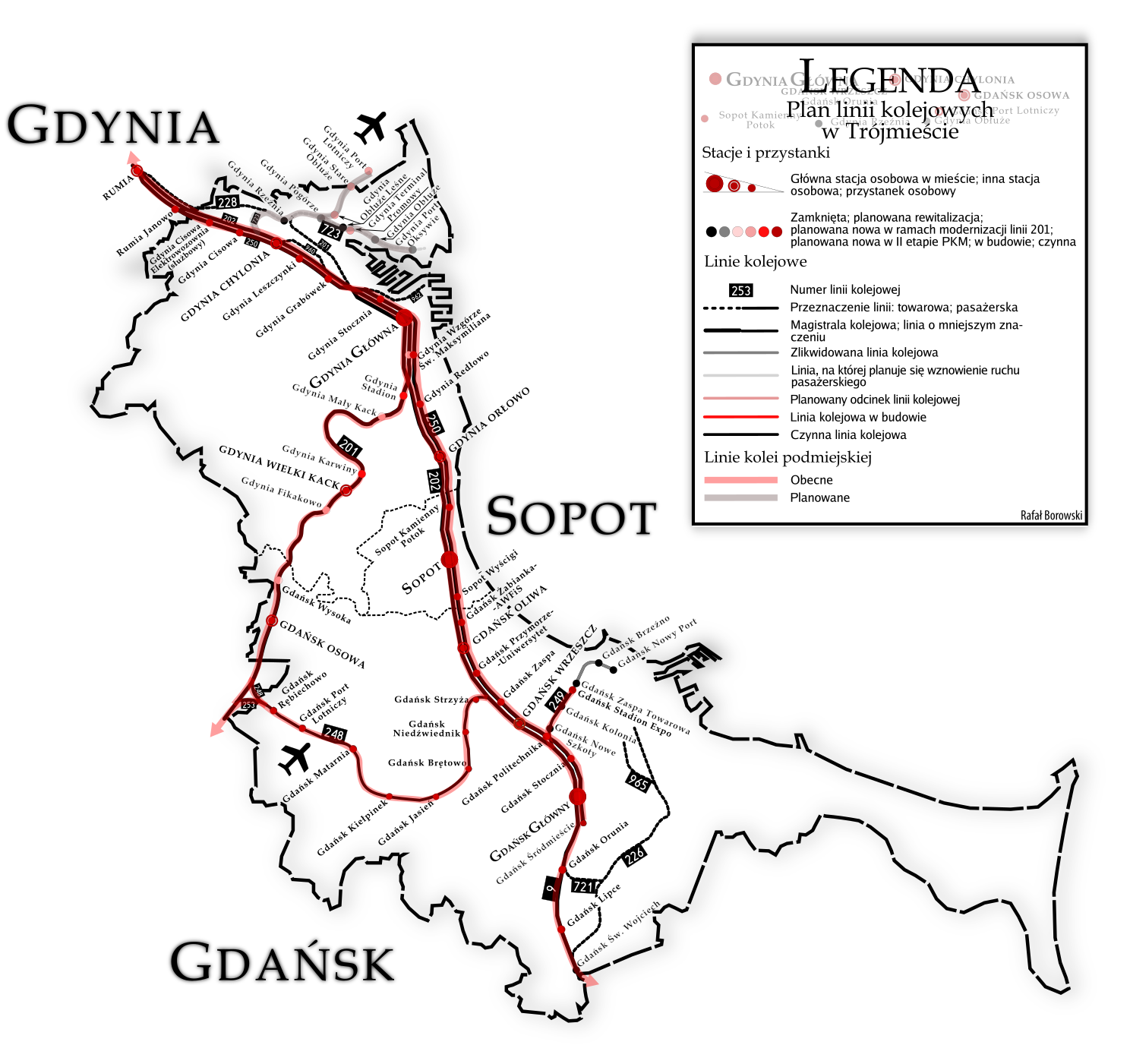
The map of SKM lines (including PKM)

The SKM route has 27 stops covering the Tricity between Gdańsk, Sopot, Gdynia and Wejherowo, all located along one continuous line parallel to the coast of the Baltic Sea. SKM service has been extended to Wejherowo and Lębork, 59 km (37 mi) west of Gdynia. The entire line is electrified, and service is operated by electric multiple unit trains at intervals of 6 to 30 minutes between trains (depending on the time of day) on the central section between Gdańsk and Gdynia, and less frequently on outlying sections. It is similar to a subway service or light rail in other European cities. The Tricity area is suited for this method of transport, as it occupies a relatively narrow north–south corridor between Gdańsk Bay and the Tricity Landscape Park.

=== Rolling stock ===
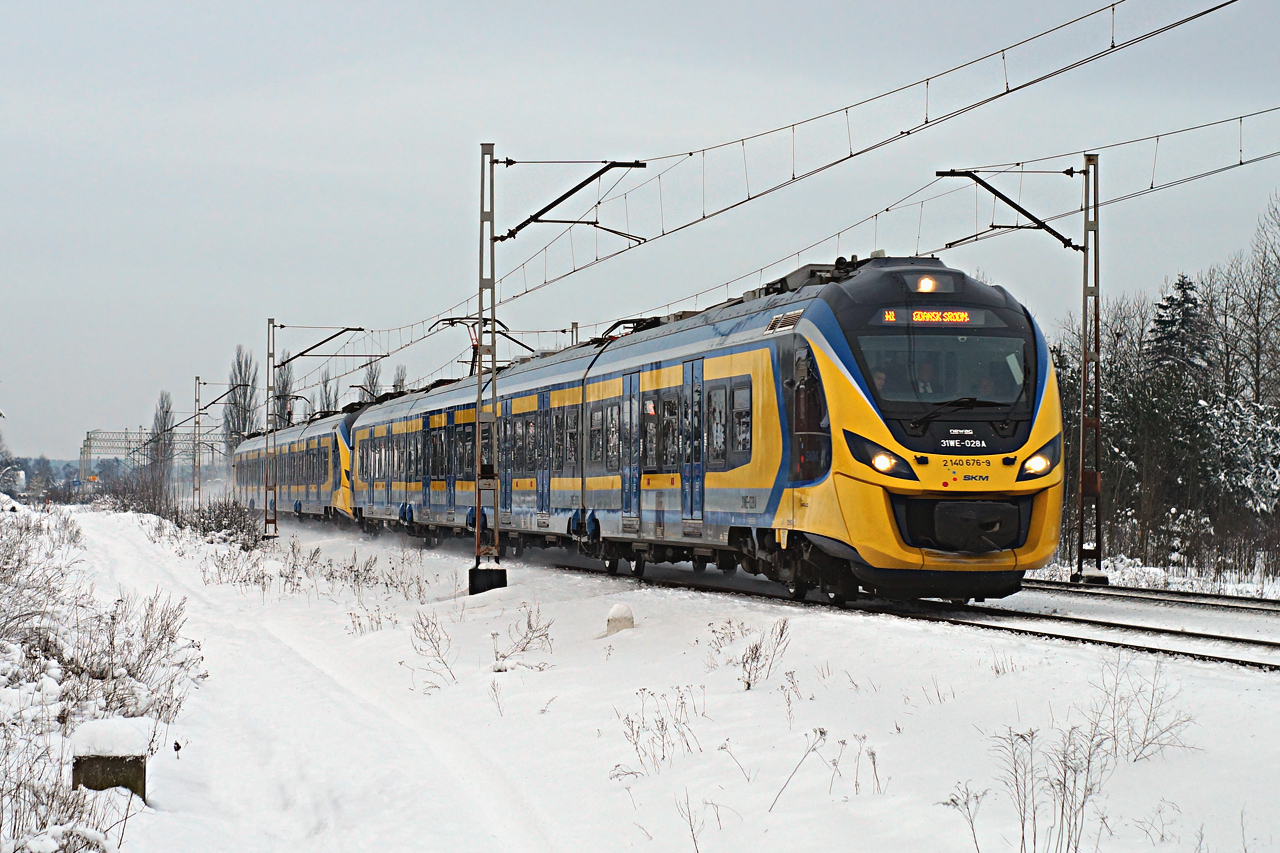
Modern Newag Impuls near Wejherowo Śmiechowo station

SKM uses mostly PKP class EN57 and EN71 electric multiple unit trains, whose design dates back to 1962 and 1976. They have since been modernised to meet EU requirements such as accessibility for handicapped passengers, advanced security and comfort. In 2016 2 new Newag Impuls trainsets were purchased. The rolling stock is maintained at Gdynia Cisowa Elektrowozownia (Gdynia Cisowa Depot), which is located on the border between Gdynia and Rumia, and also serves as company headquarters.

The EMUs have doors on both sides of the train and therefore can easily be used in either direction. Even though the SKM line has stops with high platforms, the units can be used on low platform stations as well. The most common livery for SKM electric multiple units is yellow and blue. The exception are units with advertising labels, which are coloured according to the advertiser's wishes. The SKM company logo is placed on both sides of the unit, next to the doors.

On October 29, 2007, newly refurbished EN57 units modernised by ZNTK Mińsk Mazowiecki entered service. The refurbishments included an improved shape for aerodynamics. New security systems, one of which prevents the doors from opening while the train is in motion, were also added. Additionally, dividing walls between cars were removed and seats were mounted on walls instead of on the floor. The trains were made more accessible by improving access to toilets and adding electronic displays and station announcements. Crew compartments were equipped with an air conditioning system. The total cost of modernisation came to 18,000,000 zł, 5,000,000 of which was covered by the European Union.

PKP SKM used a 55 million PLN (around €13 million) loan from the Polish Bank Gospodarstwa Krajowego (BGK) to refurbish 22 electric railway carriages, extending the lifetime by 20 years.

Image	Car type	Manufacturer	Year	Number of cars
	EN57	Pafawag	1969	18
	EN71	Pafawag	1975	11
	EN71AC	Newag	2009	1
	EN57AKM	ZNTK MM	2013-2016	26
	31WE	Newag	2016	2
	31WEbb	Newag	2023	8
	58WE	Newag	2026	20

=== Modernisation of rolling stock, 2014 ===
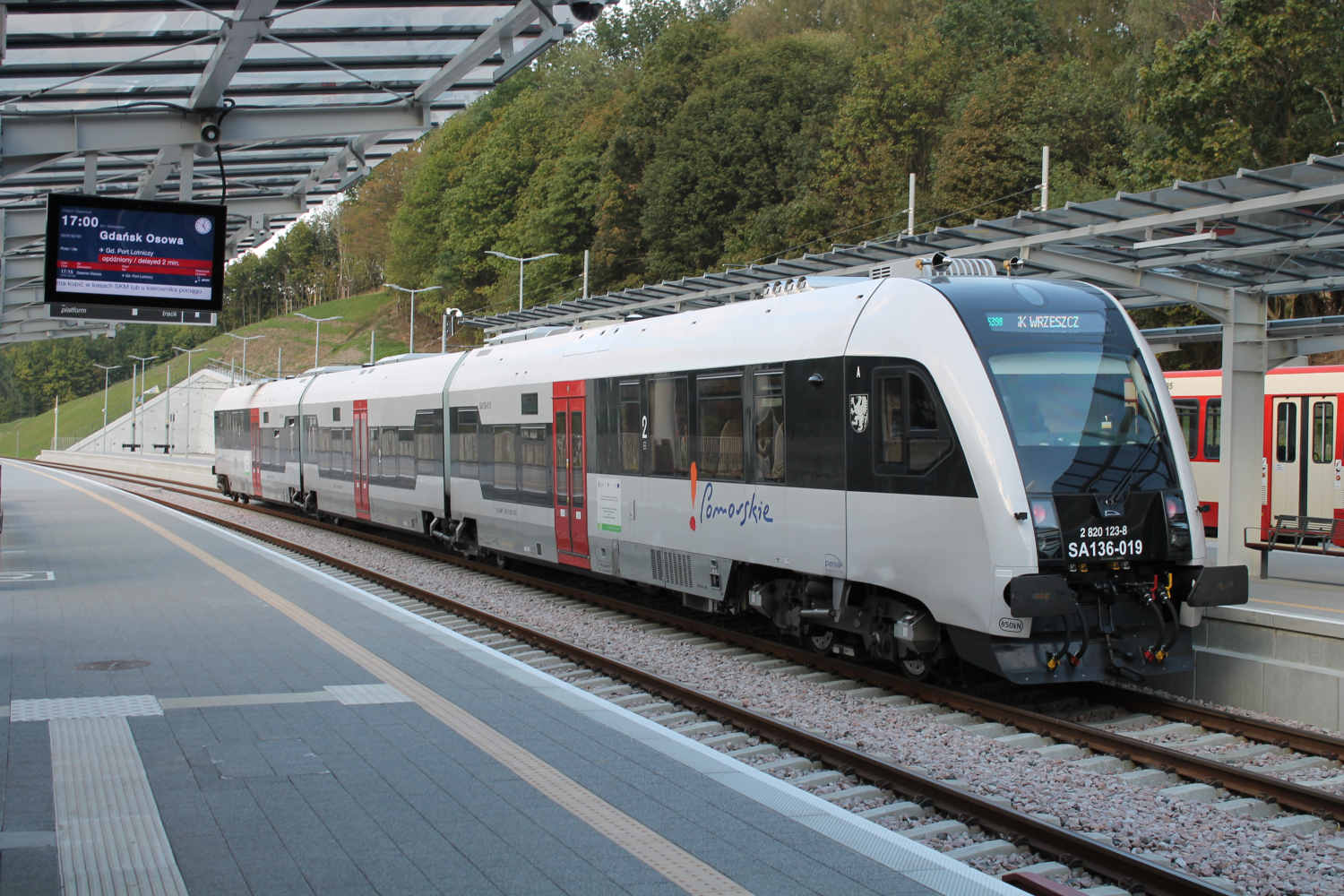
Pesa Atribo leaving Gdańsk Brętowo station

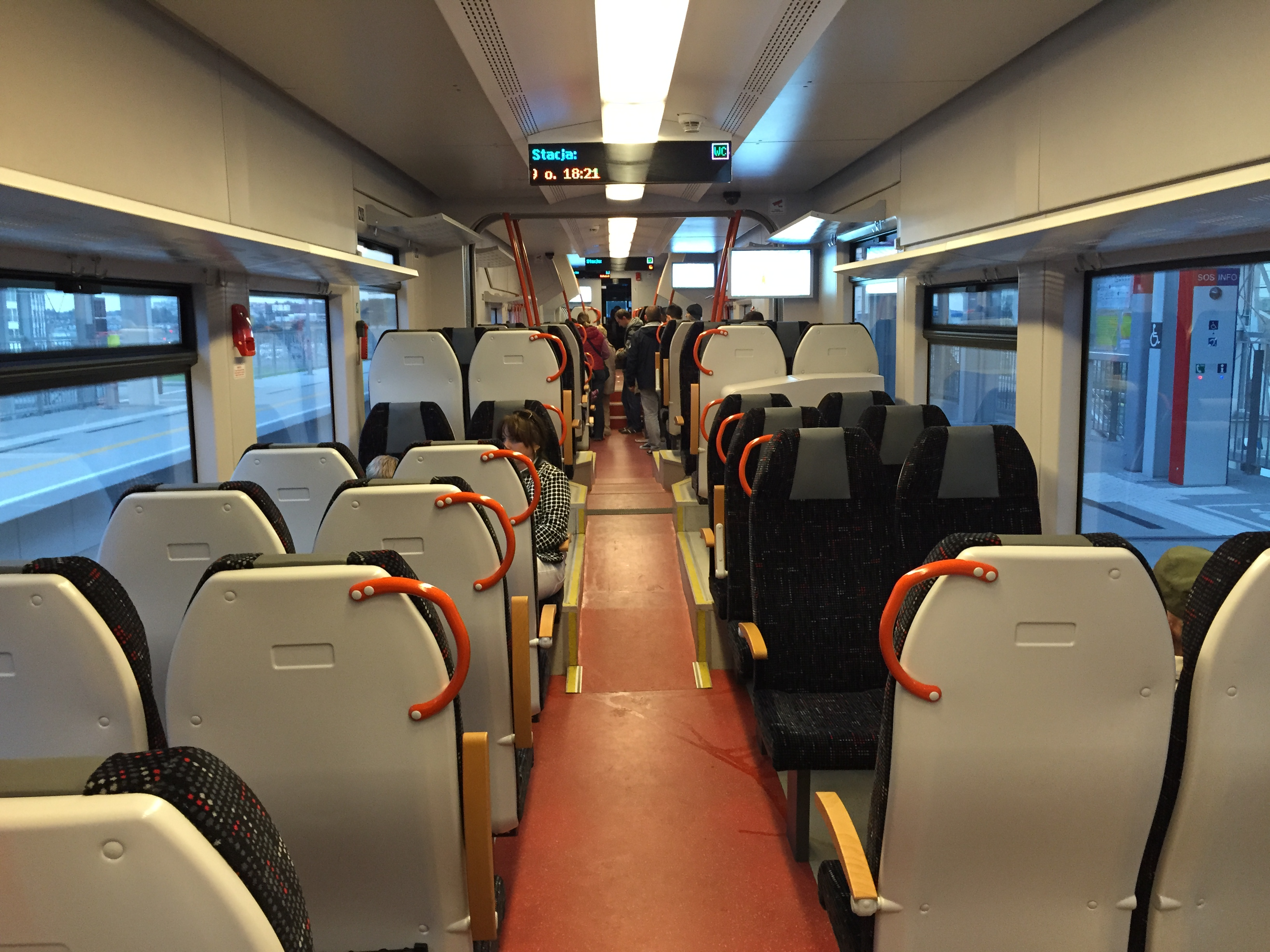
Pesa Atribo SA136 interior

In September 2013 SKM signed a contract with Pesa SA of Bydgoszcz to modernise 21 trainsets, comprising nearly one-third of SKM's fleet of 65 trainsets. The first modernised train was delivered on 31 March 2014.

The modernization includes totally new interiors and features providing accessibility for handicapped persons, and an updated exterior appearance. Electrical and mechanical changes include new propulsion systems, using modern AC motors fed by AC inverters, providing smoother acceleration, energy savings, and a higher top speed of 120 km/h (75 mph).

The delivery of the 21 modernised train-sets was completed on 25 October 2014. Modernization of the 21 trainsets cost 121 million zł.

=== Tickets ===
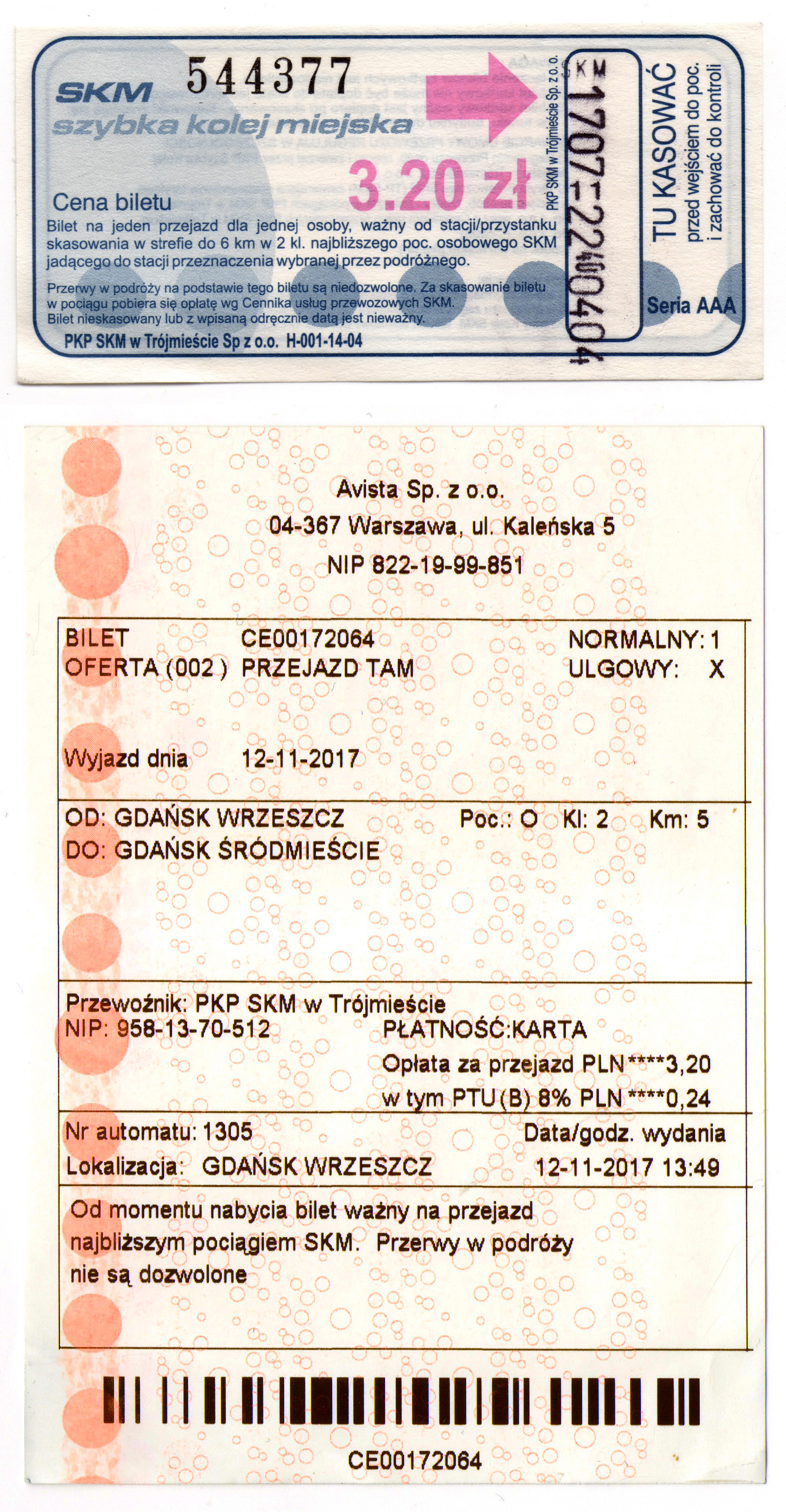
Full price 2017 tickets for less than 6km of travel. Top ticket is a single-use booklet type and bottom is a machine issued ticket for immediate use.

SKM is the only transit operator offering an own single ticket for a travel throughout entire Tricity. However, the Gdańsk Bay Public Transport Metropolitan Union (MZKZG), a body incorporated by the municipalities in the area to act as a common public transport authority, issues tickets valid both for the SKM as well as for all or some of the trams and buses in Gdańsk or trolleybuses and buses in Sopot and Gdynia.

Most of the train stops have ticket booths, and passengers wishing to start a journey at a stop without one can buy a ticket directly from the conductor. The price of a normal ticket depends on the distance of a trip, and varies from 3,20 zł. to 25,50 zł. Monthly and weekly tickets are also available, as well as discounts for students.

Tickets purchased from a machine come pre-validated and are typically only valid for the next train. A passenger boarding a train without a validating their ticket is regarded as the same as a passenger without a ticket. SKM has subcontracted a company called Renoma for ticket inspections.

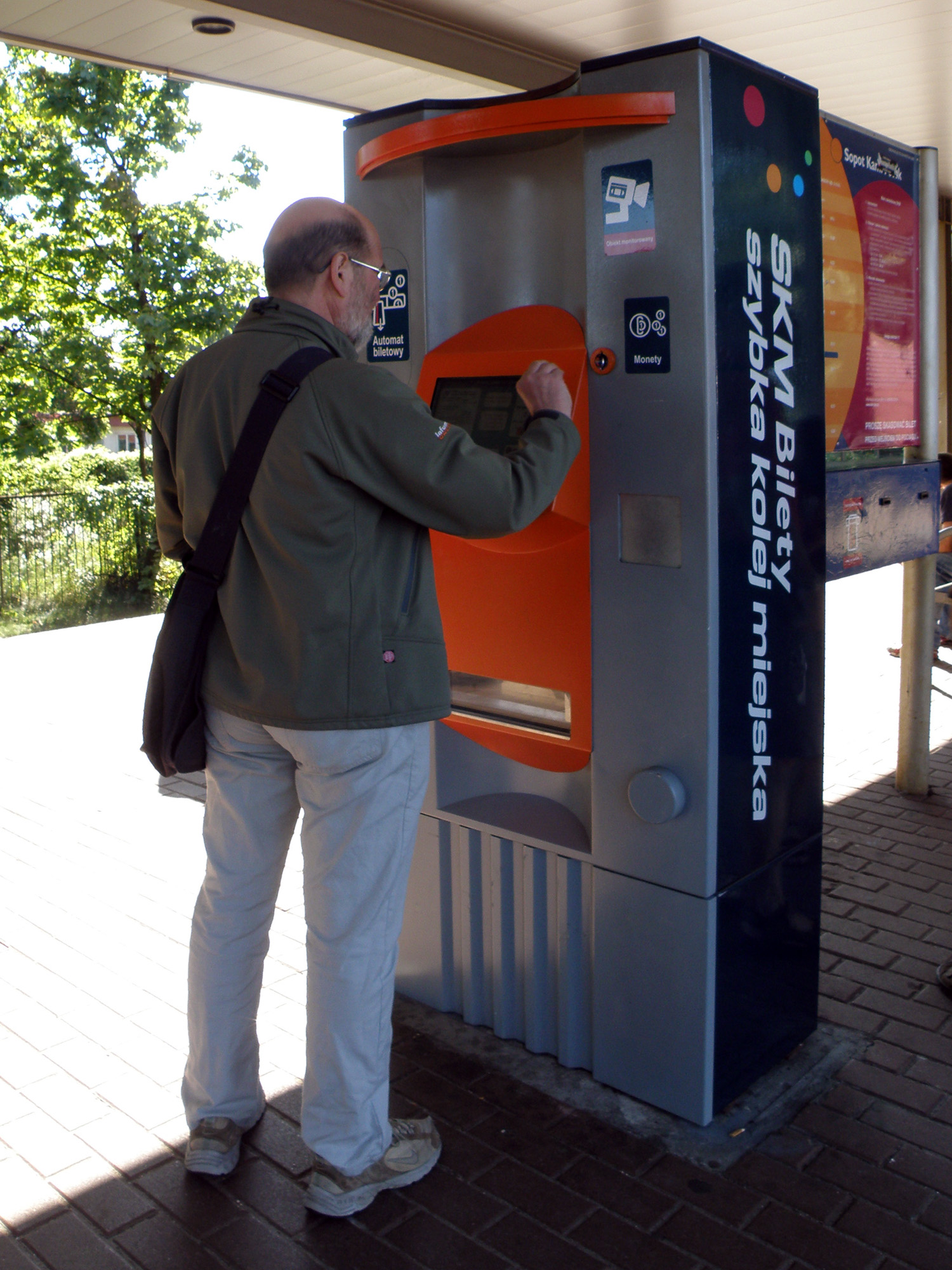
Ticket machines (with English, German and Polish language support) which are in use throughout the SKM system.

Since 2002, SKM tickets are not valid on other PKP Group trains. Previously PKP Przewozy Regionalne tickets could be used on SKM trains, and SKM tickets could be used on PKP Przewozy Regionalne trains on SKM routes. It is still possible to buy a monthly ticket valid on both companies.

The layout of the ticket has changed over time. At first, tickets were identical on all local lines, and were small cardboard rectangles, often with a hole pierced in the middle. Tickets then became orange, with a white stripe on one end for stamping information about the station and time of validation. The SKM then moved to light blue tickets, also with a white stripe which were only valid on its lines. Originally, this new layout had a list of stops printed on the reverse. Recently, this has been replaced by advertisements or information about the possibility of advertising. There are also blank tickets, sold by train conductors to sell tickets at stops where no ticket office is available. These have a list of stops with boxes to note start and destination of the journey, type of discount (if any) and number of tickets. An extra fee for sale on the train can also be noted on these tickets, for instance, if a passenger boards at a stop where he could buy a ticket normally.

Since January 2007, it has been possible to buy tickets (both single and monthly) from special vending machines. For the first week after introducing those devices SKM employees were available to show passengers how to operate them.

=== Dedicated stops ===
The Tricity Rapid Urban Railway owns 27 stops on the way from Gdańsk to Wejherowo, of which 8 are connected with railway stations. All the stops lie along a single continuous line. This has been the situation since 2005, when the spur to Gdańsk – Nowy Port has been closed for regular passenger traffic, and the terminus on this line has continued to be occasionally used only during events on the Amber Arena Stadium or in the adjacent Gdańsk Expo exhibition center.

==== The Main line ====
Throughout the Tricity, SKM has its own stops built only for its own use. The stops have high platforms, with tracks on both sides. Except at the Gdańsk Główny stop, all trains heading south stop at the western side of the platform, and trains heading north on the eastern side. SKM is systematically working on improving the quality of stops, as most of them are currently in bad shape, lacking basic services such as elevators for handicapped passengers or proper ticket validators. The company recently launched a survey, asking visitors to its website which of the stops should be repaired first. Since January 2006 SKM decided to install video cameras at stops and stations in order to improve the security level on platforms and inside station buildings.

In 2004, the Tricity Rapid Urban Railway signed an agreement with Relay, the owner of a chain of press outlets, giving the latter exclusive rights for building its kiosks on platforms. One of the conditions was the unification of the general look of kiosks. Outside the Tricity, on the Gdynia Cisowa-Wejherowo line SKM uses stops built more recently, mostly with two platforms on both sides of the tracks. The two platforms are connected by underground or overhead pedestrian passageways.

Not all stops have ticket offices, some consist simply of a platform, sometimes even without a roof. A few of the stops are connected with railway stations, as the SKM tracks are paralleled by tracks used by long-distance and regional trains. At these stations, high platforms have been built for SKM trains. Over 90% of stops are connected with other transport services (buses, trams, trolley buses, and the Gdańsk airport, while the Gdynia passenger ferry terminal is 2 bus stops away from the nearest station). At the stops which are parts of remote rail service stations, the timetables of both services match each other, especially for the night connections. The company makes a big effort to keep passengers well informed. Informational tables, lists of fares and timetables are changed as soon as the previous is out of date or destroyed (which unfortunately occurs quite often).

==== The eastern branch line to Gdańsk-Nowy Port ====
The branch line to Gdańsk–Nowy Port has been closed for regular passenger traffic, but the current terminus on this line has continued to be occasionally used only during events on the Amber Arena Stadium or in the adjacent Gdańsk Expo exhibition center. The section of the line beyond the current terminus is closed, its stops have fallen into disrepair and most of them are now ruined, despite their heritage character (those stops were built before launching SKM service in Gdańsk). Even in the last years when SKM still served this section of the line, no efforts were made to repair underground or overground pedestrian walkways or platforms. Gdańsk Nowy Port stop was the first one to be closed, when the line was shortened in 2000. As a result, SKM no longer provides service to the Gdańsk ferry terminal, as opposed to the terminal located in Gdynia.

==== The Wejherowo – Żarnowiec Nuclear Power Plant branch line ====
The former Wejherowo – Żarnowiec Nuclear Power Plant line consisted of a section of PKP rail line 230 branching off from Wejherowo, built in 1902–1910, electrified in 1986, and branching off again at Rybno Kaszubskie (PKP rail line 230A) towards Żarnowiec Elektrownia Jądrowa railway station, built specifically to serve the never-completed Żarnowiec Nuclear Power Plant. The line was established in June 1986 and six months later it was electrified. On 30 May 1992, passenger traffic on the section Rybno – Żarnowiec Nuclear Power Plant was closed and in 2001, freight traffic was closed. Currently, the line is demolished. The last part of this route (Wejherowo – Wejherowo Cementownia) was closed on 17 November 2004. Currently, the reactivation of transport on the Wejherowo – Rybno section is being considered.

==== The Pomorska Kolej Metropolitalna western branch line ====
A pre-war line demolished in 1945 by the retreating German army, has only recently been reconstructed under the designation of Pomorska Kolej Metropolitalna (PKM, the 'Pomeranian Metropolitan Railway'), linking Gdańsk-Wrzeszcz station via Gdańsk Lech Wałęsa Airport with the Gdynia Głowna station. The PKM thus forms a loop connected with the Tricity Rapid Urban Railway at both ends of its route. SKM has been selected as the operator of the PKM. There are plans to electrify the new line, which uses Diesel multiple unit trains built by Pesa SA. Service on the PKM opened on September 1, 2015.

Service of PKM was taken over by Polregio on 9 December 2022. SKM no longer operates on the route as of 2026.

==== The planned northern branch line to Gdynia-Kosakowo Airport ====
There were plans to build further stops along the existing railway to the uncompleted Gdynia-Kosakowo Airport, currently used only for freight, which would provide passenger service both to said airport, as well as for the residential housing estates quickly expanding in this area of Gdynia.

=== Route extensions ===
New connections beyond the dedicated SKM network were started to Iława, Lębork and Elbląg in 2003. At the end of 2005 a decision was made to buy a few German used diesel multiple units to re-establish the Gdynia–Kartuzy non-electrified connection, suspended at the time for some years. This move, although initially seen as poised to fail, was the first step that ultimately led to the decision to pursue the ultimately successful project of reconstructing the 1945-demolished Pomorska Kolej Metropolitarna line.

Since December 10, 2005, the southern reach of SKM service has been reduced to Tczew, while the connections to Elbląg, Malbork and Iława have been abandoned. The company has instead extended its service in the north, to the city of Słupsk.

=== Historic equipment ===
In May 2006 one of SKM's employees, Marek Pleśniar, discovered an old EMU, like ones that used to operate on SKM lines until the 1970s (and previously on Berlin S-Bahn - built in 1936 specially for 1936 Summer Olympics). Those EMUs were retired on December 20, 1976, when the traction voltage was changed from 800 V to 3000 V. After this change many of them were used as technical cars or even as holiday houses for PKP employees. The EMU found in Tuchola Forest had probably been used for this last purpose.

=== Social problems ===
A big problem for SKM are homeless people who in winter time seek shelter in the trains. SKM is trying to solve security problems in the trains, problems that are especially evident at night. Security is handled by SOK (Służba Ochrony Kolei, Rail Protection Office) officers and private security companies. Police and City Guard patrols are also more common than they once were. Another essential problem for SKM management are people defacing Electrical Multiple Units (EMUs) with graffiti. The company's spokesman, Wróblewski, assumes annually costs of removing paint from the trains as c. 150,000 zł (about US$50,000).

== Company ==
=== General information ===
The Tricity Rapid Urban Railway is a limited company. It is part of the PKP Group, which was founded in 2001 after PKP had been split into several companies in order to meet European Union standards. SKM is responsible for passenger transport across Tricity, and is fully dependent on PKP SA company. SKM is one of the companies which is set for quick privatization.

The main goal of the company is to manage the special rail line (PKP rail line 250) and provide urban rail transport. The incorporation act was signed on December 22, 2000, and the company was registered on December 29, 2000. Operations began on July 1, 2001.

Although it noted a loss in 2003, SKM posted profits in previous years, as well as in 2004 and 2005. The company is involved in many cultural events in Tricity, mainly as a sponsor. SKM is managed by a two-person management board.

==== Shareholders ====
The ownership structure as of 2018 as follows:

1. 222,218 shares (67.047%) Are owned by Polish State Railways SA.
2. 42,000 shares (12.672%) Owned by the Municipality of Gdańsk.
3. 34,000 shares (10.258%) Owned by the province of Pomerania.
4. 21,600 shares (6.517%) Owned by the Municipality of Gdynia.
5. 7,000 shares (2.112%) Owned by the Municipality of Sopot.
6. 4,000 shares (1.207%) Owned by the Municipality of Pruszcz Gdański.
7. 620 shares (0.187%) Owned by the Municipality of Rumia.331438

== History ==
=== Before 1945 ===
The first steps towards building additional tracks for suburban service between Gdańsk and Sopot were taken in 1912. Station tracks were modified, and buildings were torn down on the planned route. The project was interrupted by the outbreak of World War I.

During the interwar period 1919 – 1939, the Tricity area was divided into two zones under two different governments. Gdańsk (Danzig) was a Free City not in Poland, while the new city of Gdynia was part of Poland. The transportation systems of the two zones were completely separate. Although rail transport in Gdańsk was operated by PKP, the city authorities of Gdańsk did not revive plans for an urban rail service.

World War II caused terrible devastation in Gdańsk. But after the war, the borders dividing the Tricity were abolished.

=== After World War II ===
When World War II ended in 1945, all of the Tricity became part of Poland.

The first plan for electrification of the Gdańsk railway network was developed by Prof. Roman Podoski of the Politechnika Warszawska, an advocate of railway electrification. The plan called for electrification of the existing tracks. But a much bolder and more expensive plan, calling for the construction of two additional tracks to serve traffic within the urban area, was proposed by Zbigniew Modliński, then director of the Gdańsk Regional Board of Polish Railways, and later Polish Vice-minister of Transport. The second plan was adopted. In October 1950 the decision was made to build separate tracks for the urban railway. A branch of the Warsaw 'Bureau of Railway Electrification' was established in Gdańsk to prepare the plans.

Rolling stock for the new service came to Poland as war reparations from Germany. During the war, Berlin S-Bahn cars were overhauled in the (then) German town of Luben to the east of Berlin. When that town, now known as Lubin, was ceded to Poland under the terms of the Potsdam Conference in 1945, eighty-four (84) S-Bahn cars were in the Luben repair shops. Additional cars were sent to countries east of Germany as war reparations, and while many were sent to Russia, at least 80 two-car sets, and possibly as many as 189 cars, remained in Poland. These cars were allocated to the Tricity region for use on suburban services, and one set is preserved in this condition at a museum at Koscierzyna.

The cars operated in Berlin on an 800 volt DC third rail power supply, a system which is still used today in Germany but was not used in Poland. They were modified in Poland by changing the power supply system from 800 V using third rail to a system using an overhead catenary. Also, the small lights were changed to larger ones that would conform with PKP standards. A total of 80 two-car electric multiple units, belonging to three different series ET165, ET166 and ET167 were modified. They were later renumbered as Polish series EW90, EW91 and EW92. A temporary depot for the German cars was established on the Gdańsk – Gdańsk Nowy Port route near Gdańsk Zaspa Towarowa station.

The first train from Gdańsk to Sopot ran on 2 January 1952. At that time, double-track existed only on the Gdańsk – Gdańsk Wrzeszcz segment, and the line to Sopot still had only one track. The second track to Sopot was completed on 22 June 1952. This second track allowed service frequency to be increased to every 10 minutes. On July 22, 1952, the double-track connection to Gdynia Orłowo was completed. On May 1, 1954, the electrified double-track reached Gdynia Główna railway station, the principal station in Gdynia. On 15 January 1956 the double track was extended further to Gdynia Chylonia, and on December 31, 1957, the first electric multiple units reached Wejherowo.

On the Gdynia – Wejherowo segment, SKM ran on tracks shared with other trains. Tracks built for urban rail service from Gdańsk to Gdynia were built to different specifications than mainline tracks, with curves of smaller radius, bridges built for lower loads, and a top speed limited to 70 km/h.

The electrification on the long-distance tracks was switched over to 3000 V DC, the Polish standard system, on 14 September 1969, and on 19 October 1969, it was switched to 3000 V DC between Gdynia Główna railway station and Wejherowo. Since the former Berlin cars only operated on 800 V DC, service between Gdynia and Wejherowo was taken over by new EN57 EMUS built in Poland by Pafawag in Wrocław. To relieve the pressure on the increasingly worn-out Berlin cars, these were only used on the line between Gdańsk Glowny and Gdynia Stocznia, and passengers travelling to further points changed trains at Gdynia Stocznia.

=== 1976: Retirement of Berlin cars, power supply changed to 3000 V DC ===
It had been originally assumed that the useful life of the ex-German cars and the associated 800 V DC power supply would be 15 to 20 years, and in the early 1970s it became clear that the time for a complete replacement of rolling stock had come – to occur on a day called 'Day X.' Finally, on Sunday, 19 December 1976 all SKM traffic was halted in preparation for the switch-over, and on 20 December 1976, the entire SKM system was switched over to 3000 V DC, the standard Polish system. On the changeover date, the electrical substations supplying 800 V DC power were disconnected, and the power supply was reconnected to new electrical substations supplying 3000 V DC which had been built in advance. This required other changes, including lengthening of platforms and building a new depot complex in Gdynia Cisowa. The changeover caused widespread disruption in the Tricity, since it happened on the busy weekend before Christmas and the public did not receive adequate notice in advance

The former Berlin cars were immediately withdrawn from service, since they could not operate on 3000 V DC. One of the old Berlin trainsets can be viewed in the railway museum in Kościerzyna. In preparation for the changeover, a new series of cars called EW58 had been developed, incorporating technical innovations such as thyristor controls, anti-wheel-slip devices and so forth, which were expected to provide major improvements. The first EW58s were tested in 1974. But the EW58s required components purchased with Western hard currency, a major problem in Communist Poland. The technological innovations proved troublesome in actual practice, and the high energy demands of the EW58s strained the power supply. In the end, twenty-eight (28) three-car EW58 trainsets were produced by 1980.

The remainder of the SKM fleet was equipped with EN57 and EN71 cars built by Pafawag in Wrocław. The latter EN71 is a four-car version of the three-car EN57 trainset.

Until the 1970s, the ridership continued to grow heavily, which surprised even the builders of the line. In 1959 the number of travellers reached over 50 million passengers annually. About 152,700 residents were said to live within a distance no more than 800 metres from SKM stations. More than 40% of the Tricity population used this means of urban transport. However, this led to a problem that is still evident to this day—crowding in the trains. Back in those days, some people were forced to ride on the outside of the trains.

=== 1970s and 80s ===
Changes in the number of passengers served annually between 1960 and 1990

Traffic on the lines reached its peak during this period. The introduction of automatic block signals allowed an increase in train frequency to every 6 minutes. Construction of a third track on the Gdynia – Rumia segment also continued. Thanks to the change to 3000 V, the electric multiple units were able to operate beyond the Gdańsk – Wejherowo line, and run on the same tracks as standard trains in case of emergency. As a result, regular trains could also run on SKM tracks. In 1975, the annual number of passengers travelling by SKM exceeded 100 million people. Ridership sometimes reached 300 thousand passengers daily.

The eighties were a time of economic recession, not only for railroad. No new investments, except for the ones started in the 1970s, were made. The electrification of Polish railways was progressing rapidly instead, and plans appeared to electrify the Gdynia – Kościerzyna route. Construction of the first Polish nuclear power plant in Żarnowiec started in 1986, and three units were planned for this village in 1986–1990.

=== Unrealised plans ===
The original plans called for electrification of the line from Gdańsk to Pruszcz Gdański, but this plan was abandoned in the 1950s when it was realized that it would require moving some catenary supports which had been placed too close to the track. This catenary supports had been part of a railway line in Sudetenland electrified by the German Railways, then confiscated by the Soviet Red Army and brought to Poland. This former German equipment was subsequently moved to the Gdańsk – Nowy Port line and to the vicinity of Gdynia Postojowa where it remains in use today. Later plans in the 1960s for building new tracks to Pruszcz Gdański would have required demolition of the historic Gdańsk Główny railway station and replacing it with a postmodern concrete-block structure. This plan was not carried out.

In 1953-1954 a project was developed to electrify the Gdańsk – Nowy Port line using 1500 V DC current, and a number of EW90 cars were modified to operate at this voltage in 1954. The operation lasted until the 'first snowfalls' of winter, when their electric motors developed problems due to freezing and moisture in their insulation.

Several times in the 1960s and 1970s plans were made to connect Wrzeszcz with Kokoszki and Kartuzy. It is surprising that this line was not rebuilt and electrified, as the cost was relatively modest. A more ambitious project called for a Seaside SKM that was to run from Zaspa Towarowa to Sopot, east of the existing line, to relieve pressure on the crowded (Sopot - Gdańsk) section.

=== Time of changes ===
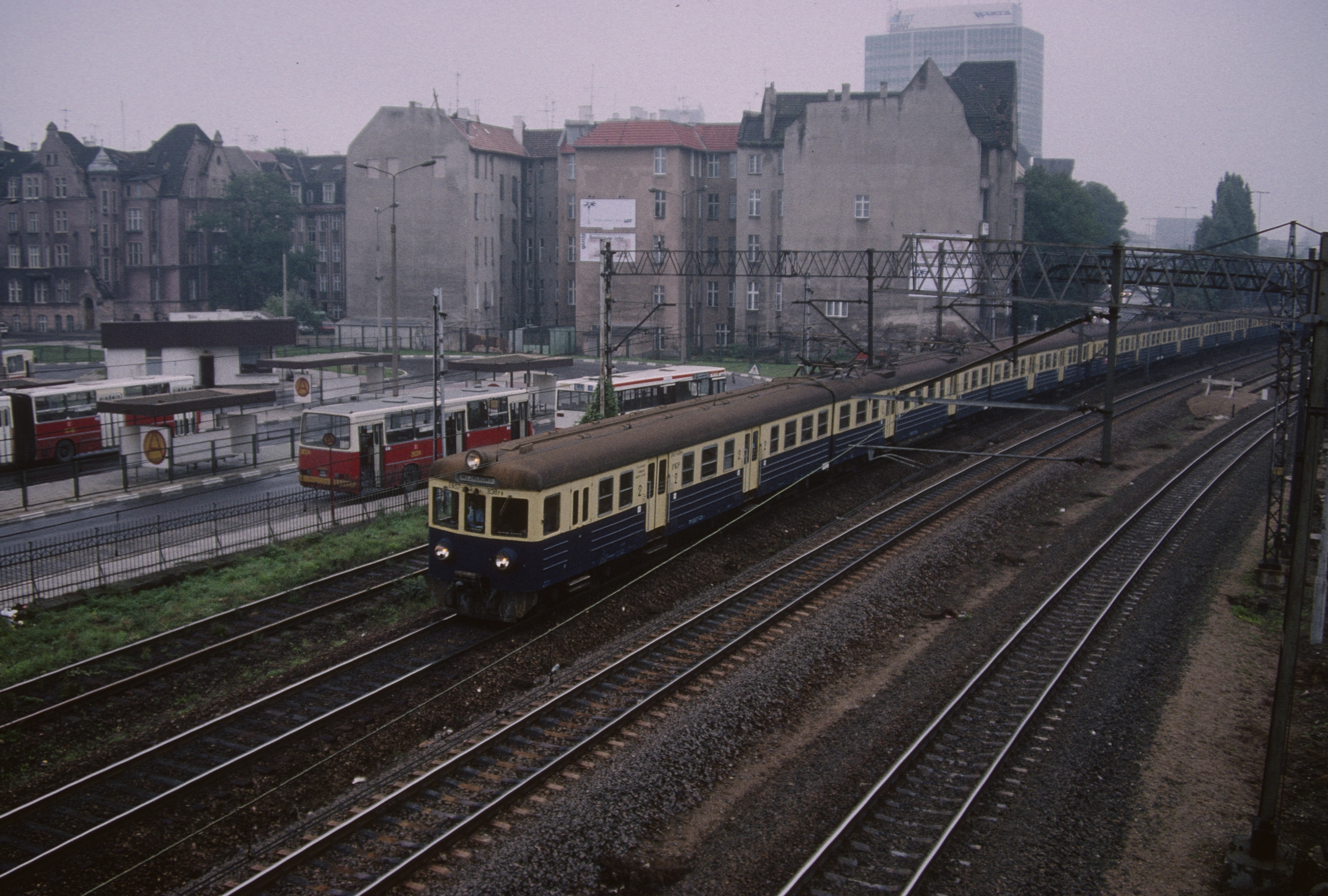
EN57-838 on SKM service in Gdańsk, September 1994

The fall of the communist regime and the change of economic system brought an enormous increase in the use of private automobiles, and as a result a decreasing number of passengers in urban mass transport. During the 1990s, the annual number of passengers served by SKM was halved, from 80 million to 40 million, but it continued to be an important urban transport service in Tricity.

Market economy forced many reorganizations in PKP. The main change was to leave the division made on a geographical basis and start to divide PKP in departments depending on responsibility. As a part of these changes, the Urban Passenger Transport Department was founded in Gdańsk, responsible for marketing trade side of SKM.

Alongside these changes, works on commercializing PKP were in progress and soon after SKM became a separate company in July 2001. In June 2005 the line to Nowy Port was finally closed, as it provided no income.

On December 2, 2005, SKM achieved 25th place in the top 100 Polish companies by Rzeczpospolita newspaper. It was the highest place in Pomeranian Voivodship and the highest position for the company from the PKP Group.

== See also ==
- Rapid Urban Railway (Warsaw)
- Polskie Koleje Państwowe
- PKP Group
- Pomeranian Metropolitan Railway
- Polish locomotives designation
- History of rail transport in Poland
