= PKP class EN71 =

Polish electric multiple unit

PKP EN71
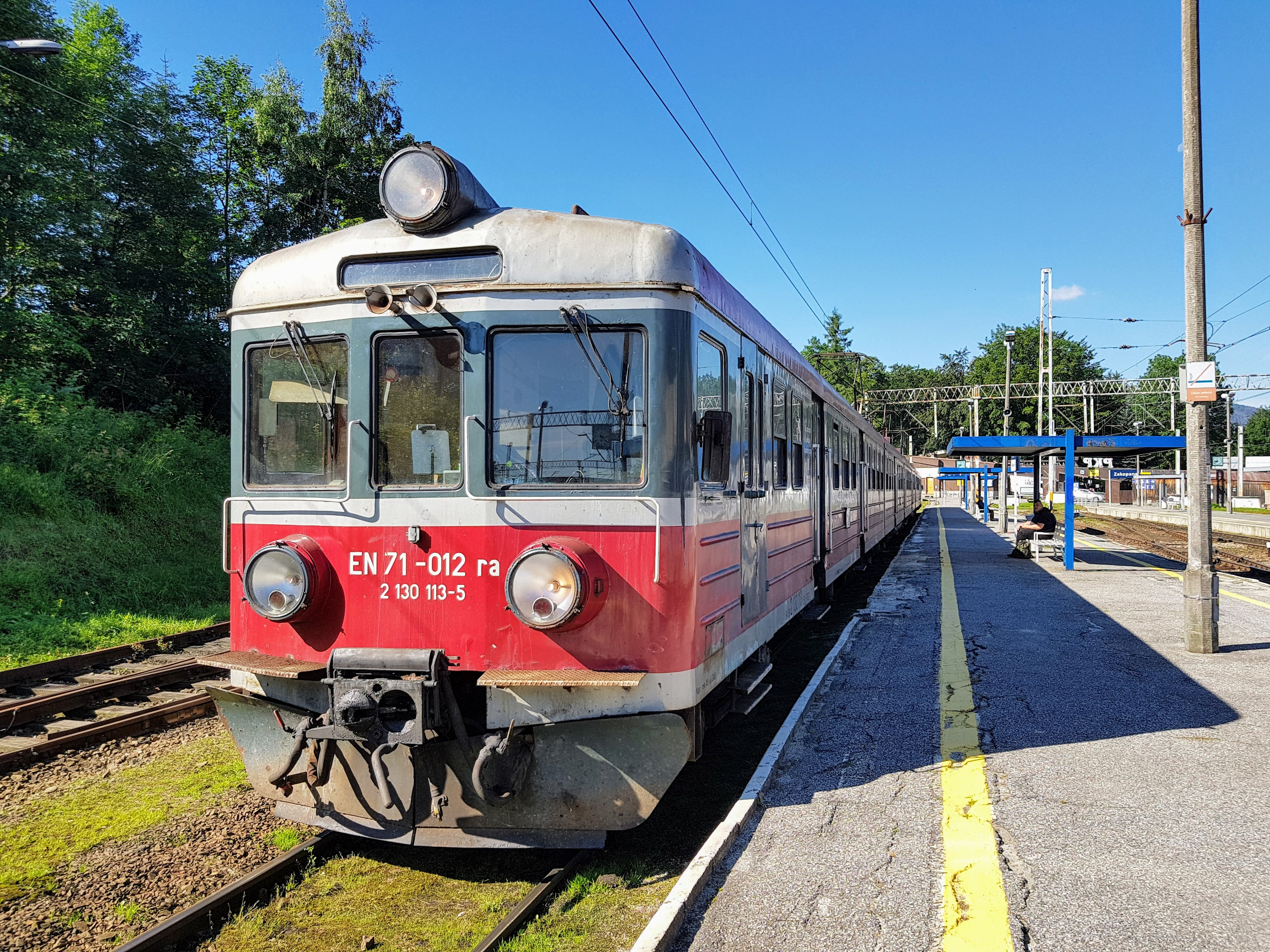
- EN71-012 at Zakopane
- In service: 1976–present (Poland); 1965–1991 (Yugoslavia); 1991–2011 (Croatia); 1991–2021 (Slovenia)
- Manufacturer: Pafawag
- Built at: Pafawag
- Family name: Pafawag 5Bg/6Bg
- Constructed: 1965–1976 (serial production); 1981–1984 (conversions from EN57)
- Entered service: 1965
- Refurbished: Serwis Pojazdów Szynowych ASO, SNiUT Gdynia Cisowa, ZNTK Mińsk Mazowiecki, Newag; 2007–present
- Formation: 4 cars per trainset ra+s+s+rb
- Capacity: 252 / 264 / 288 seats
- Operators: PKP, PR, KM, SKM, Yugoslav Railways, Hrvatske Željeznice, Slovenske železnice

Specifications
- Train length: 86,840 mm (284 ft 11 in)
- Doors: 4
- Maximum speed: 110 km/h (70 mph)
- Weight: 182 tonnes (179 long tons; 201 short tons)
- Power output: Continuous: 1,160 kW (1,556 hp)
- Transmission: LKf450 traction motors
- HVAC: Electric heating
- UIC classification: 2′2′+Bo′Bo′+Bo′Bo′+2′2′
- Braking systems: Oerlikon, Oerlikon + Electro-Pneumatic (modernizated units)
- Safety systems: Radio-Stop, SHP, CA
- Coupling system: Scharfenberg
- Multiple working: EN57, ED72
- Track gauge: 1,435 mm (4 ft 8 1/2 in)

The EN71 (manufacturer's designation: Pafawag 5Bg/6Bg) is a four-carriage Polish EMU constructed for the Polish National Railways (PKP). It is based on the three-carriage EN57, but differs in that it has an additional motor carriage.

== History ==
Originally developed for the Yugoslav market, the EN71 in Poland was designed to replace the EN57, which was struggling to cope with the steep inclines of the newly electrified Kraków – Zakopane route. Twenty EN71s were built at the PaFaWag works in 1976 and a further 30, or so, were converted from individual EN57 units in 1981–84. The original twenty EN71s had bodywork made from corrugated metal; units with numbers above 20 are converted from EN57s and can, therefore, have bodywork made from either flat or corrugated metal panels.

== Construction ==
The EN71 is made up of four carriages: two with cabs; two with motors. The former (factory designation 5B) are marked as ra — where r stands for rozrządczy (the Polish term for control car) and a signifies that this is the front end of the train — and rb. The motor carriages (factory designation 6B) are classified as s, which is short for silnikowy, Polish for approximately engine-equipped. The sets can be connected together using Scharfenberg couplers, which prevent access between sets.

Each carriage is equipped with two sets of automatic, pneumatic powered doors and is split into three sections with seating — a central aisle running between the seats. The front and rearmost passenger sections of the control car are arranged differently from the rest: they contain foldable seats built into the wall of the carriage, as well as an extra set of doors that can be opened manually. According to need, these sections can also serve as compartments for staff or for transporting bicycles, pushchairs, and oversize luggage. The driver's cab is accessible via a separate, manually operated door at the front of the carriage. In contrast to the EN57 series, all EN71s (with exception to EN71-100) are equipped with racks for skis located next to the passenger compartment doors.

== Service history ==
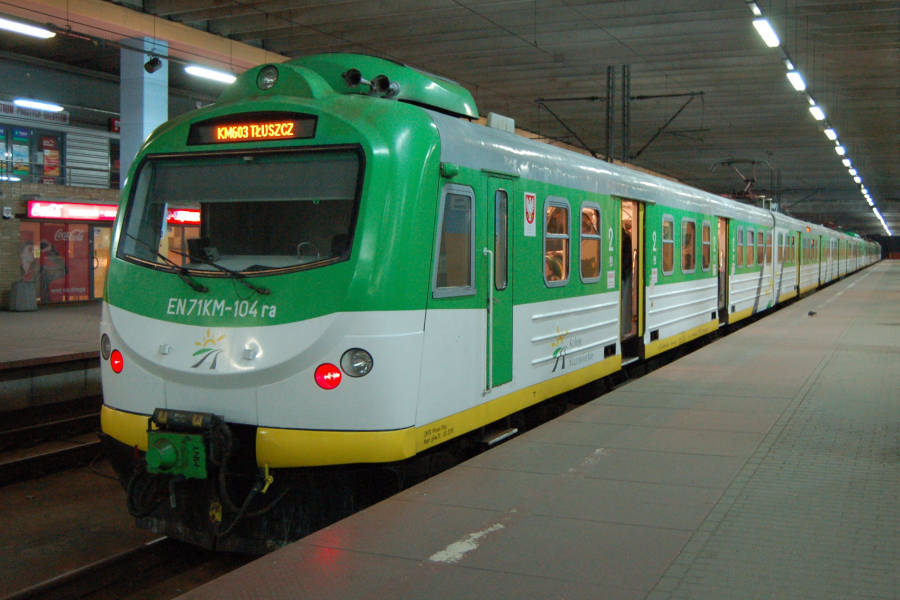
EN71KM of Masovian Railways

The EN71 series are operated by Polregio and Tricity Rapid Urban Railway in the Tricity area, EN71-046 was used for 3 weeks by Rapid Urban Railway (Warsaw). As has been mentioned in the History section, the new EN71s were set to work on the Kraków-Zakopane route, which had been electrified in 1975. In the years that followed, the series saw use on the routes to Krynica and Szklarska Poręba. At the beginning of the 1990s, several EN71s were modernised and became more comfortable (1st class carriages were also built). These new EN71s were assigned to a new service called RegioPlus before becoming superseded by the ED72 series.

== Service in other countries ==
Total of 37 four-carriage units were exported to Yugoslavia along with the three-carriage EN57 in the 1960s and 1970s. A few have recently returned to Poland, purchased by Masovian Railways and various other companies.

== See also ==
- Polish locomotives designation
