= PKP class ED73 =

Polish prototype electric multiple unit

PKP ED73
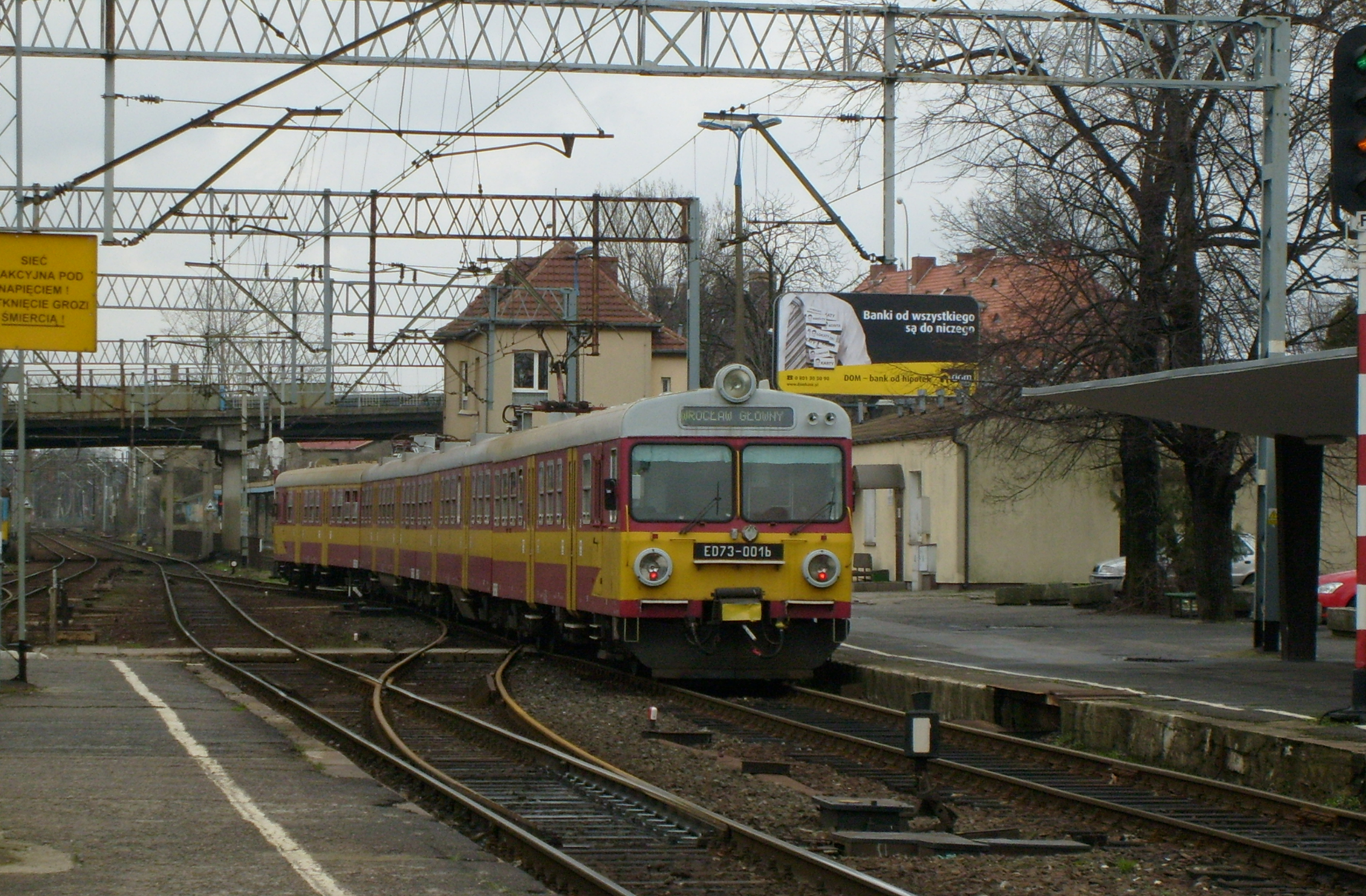
- ED73
- Manufacturer: Pafawag
- Constructed: 1997
- Scrapped: 2019
- Number built: 1
- Number preserved: 0
- Formation: ra+s+s+rb
- Capacity: 235 seats
- Operator: PKP

Specifications
- Train length: 86,840 mm (284 ft 11 in)
- Width: 2,880 mm (9 ft 5 in)
- Height: 3,720 mm (12 ft 2 in)
- Maximum speed: 120 km/h (75 mph)
- Weight: 178 tonnes (175 long tons; 196 short tons)
- Power output: Continuous: 1,400 kW (1,877 hp)
- Transmission: 68:21
- HVAC: Electric heating
- UIC classification: 2′2′+Bo′Bo′+Bo′Bo′+2′2′
- Track gauge: 1,435 mm (4 ft 8 1/2 in)

The ED73 (manufacturer's designation: Pafawag 5Bt/6Bt) was a Polish four-car, long distance EMU operated by Polregio (PR), based on the ED72 and EN57.

== History ==
Only one unit was built at the Pafawag factory in 1997 and as a prototype at that. Until 2005, ED73-001 was operated by Wielkopolski Zakład Przewozów Regionalnych (Greater Poland Regional Transport). Due to it not being technically sound, the unit was moved to a siding. In mid-2006 ED73-001 was sent to Dolnośląski Zakład Przewozów Regionalnych (Lower Silesian Regional Transport) in Wrocław where it underwent general repairs.

ED73-001 was repainted into its original burgundy-yellow livery, and in January 2008 was actively used on Lower Silesian routes. From February 2010 this EMU was used on Łódź - Warsaw route. Since 2012, it was stored in Polregio base in Kruszewiec, and was scrapped in August 2019, despite efforts of railway enthusiasts from Polskie Towarzystwo Miłośników Kolei and "Stacja Chrzanów" to preserve the unit.

== Modifications ==
Although it was cosmetically identical to its sister machine, the ED73 featured several improvements over the ED72. Amongst these were: bogies with pneumatic suspension; anti-skid devices; outward opening pneumatic doors (only one unit from the ED72 series had these installed); pneumatic doors between carriages; new transmission permitting a top speed of 120 km/h (≈ 75 mph); and eight traction engines with a combined maximum power output of 1,560 kW — allowing for an acceleration rate of 0.41 m/s² when the train is fully loaded.

The final modification was made inside the first class carriage, where a special compartment and toilet had been built for disabled passengers. However, the carriage was not designed to enable easy access for passengers in wheelchairs.

== Resources ==
- Modern Locos Gallery
- Rail Service
- www.lokomotywy.prv.pl
- Mikoleje
- Chabówka Rail Museum

== See also ==
- Polish locomotives designation
