= PKP class ED72 =

Class of Polish electric multiple unit

PKP ED72
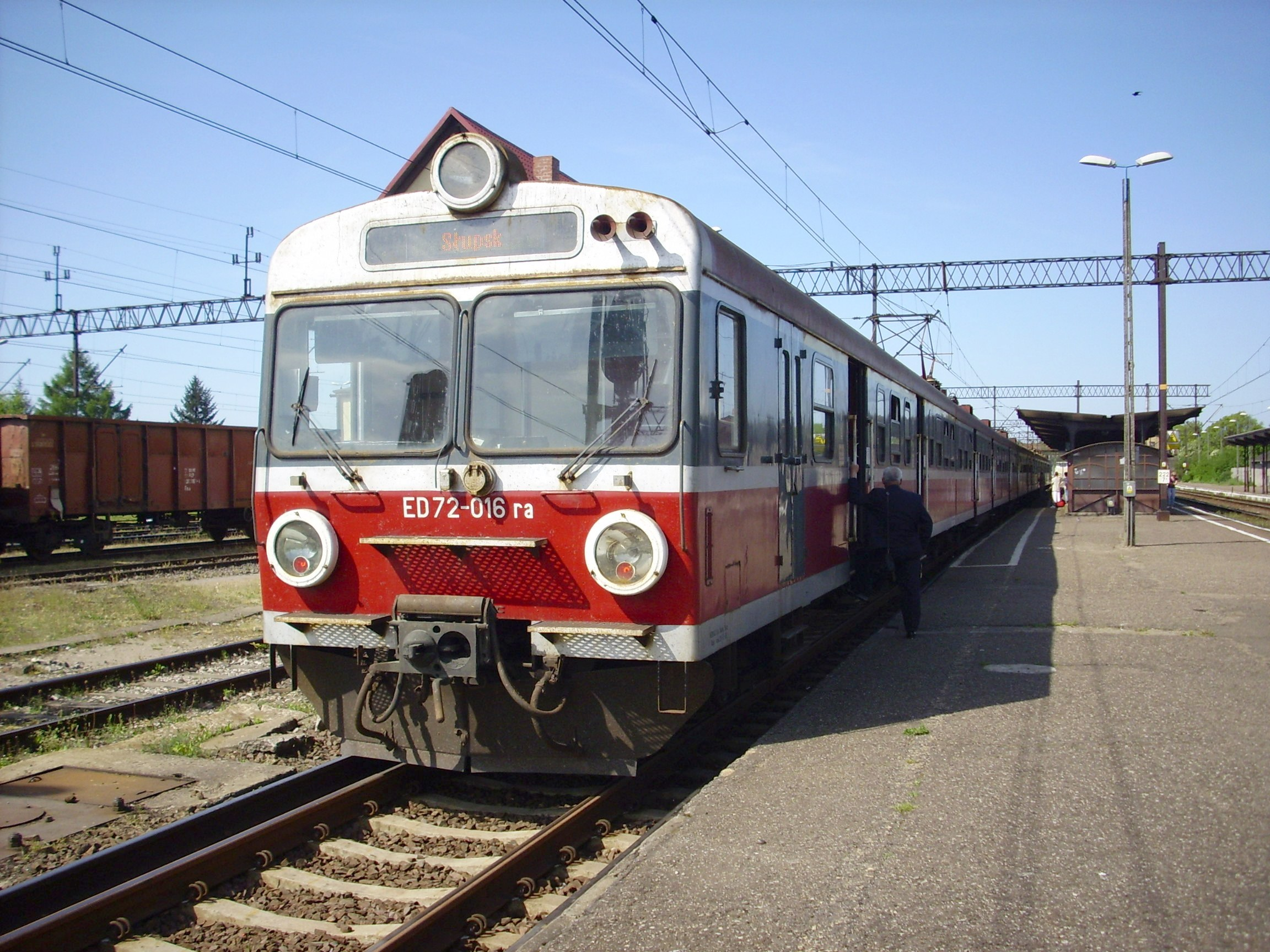
- ED72-016 in the 2nd Polregio livery at Białogard, May 2008
- In service: 1993–present
- Manufacturer: Pafawag
- Constructed: 1993–1997
- Refurbished: ZNTK "Minsk Mazowiecki", PESA Bydgoszcz and Polregio Kruszewiec Rolling Stock Repair Plant; 2011–2020
- Number built: 21 trainsets
- Formation: 4 cars per trainset (ra+s+s+rb)
- Capacity: 232–288 seats
- Operators: PKP (1993–2001); Polregio (2001–present); Arriva RP (2013–2015)

Specifications
- Train length: 86,840 mm (284 ft 11 in)
- Width: 2,800 mm (9 ft 2 in)
- Height: 3,720 mm (12 ft 2 in)
- Maximum speed: ED72A and ED72Ac rebuilds: 130 km/h (80 mph); Original: 110 km/h (70 mph)
- Weight: 182 tonnes (179 long tons; 201 short tons)
- Power output: Continuous: 1,160 kW (1,556 hp)
- Transmission: LKf450 or LKa470 traction motors
- HVAC: Electric heating
- UIC classification: 2′2′+Bo′Bo′+Bo′Bo′+2′2′
- Braking system: Oerlikon
- Safety systems: Radio-Stop, SHP
- Coupling system: Scharfenberg
- Multiple working: EN57, EN71
- Track gauge: 1,435 mm (4 ft 8 1/2 in)

The ED72 (manufacturer's designation: Pafawag 5Bs/6Bs) is a Polish four-car, long distance electric multiple unit operated by Przewozy Regionalne (Polregio). Like its cousin (EN71), the ED72 is based on the EN57 and became the basis for its successor: the ED73.

== History ==
Between 1993 and 1997, 21 units were built by Pafawag. The newly built ED72s were assigned to large interregional transit operations in the towns of Poznań, Szczecin, Kraków, and Bydgoszcz.

The series was created as an "upmarket" replacement for the more spartan EN57 and EN71 electric multiple units. The express passenger service, InterRegio, for which the series was designed, did not find the ED72 to be as comfortable as they had anticipated.

Currently, all 21 units are still in use, servicing mostly InterRegio and some local Regio and RegioPlus trains.

== Modifications ==
The ED72 introduced a number of innovations over the previous series of EMUs. Amongst these was converting the rb (rear control cars) sections to first class units which were fitted with more comfortable seats, as well as new upholstery in the second class carriages. Double glazed windows were fitted; buttons for opening and closing the doors were installed — rather than having to wait for the driver to operate them; and matrix route manifests were installed, as opposed to the traditional blinds which only displayed the train's destination. The last unit to be produced — ED72-021 — is unique in that it has sliding doors that open outwards.

In terms of the unit's appearance, the major difference — apart from the red and yellow colour scheme — is the control cars' front ends. Furthermore, ED72s were originally equipped with single-arm pantographs, but most have been converted to using the traditional, diamond-shaped, double-arm version.

The ED72's couplers allow it to be easily connected to other EMUs, and this is done quite frequently.

== Rebuilds and refurbishment ==
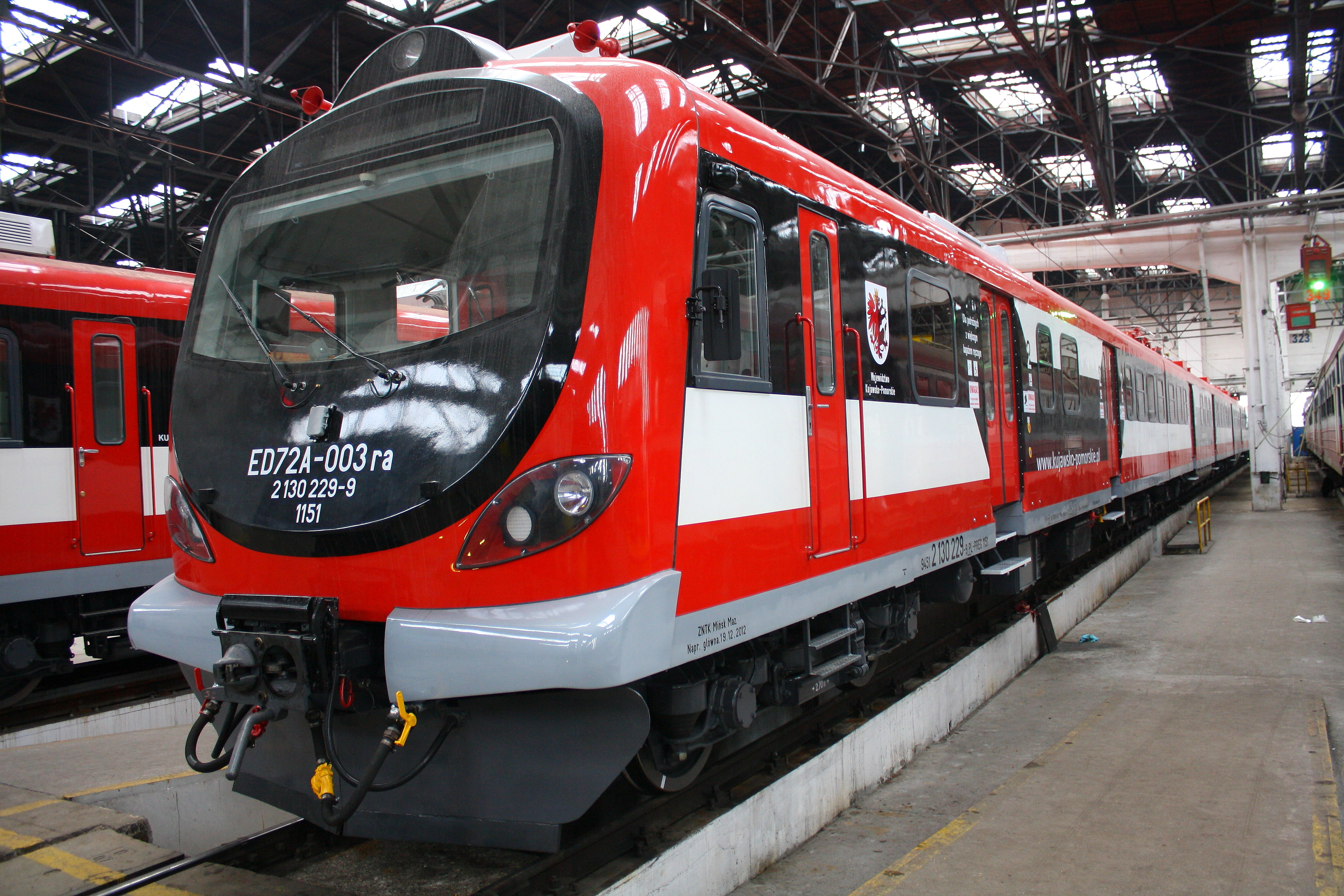
ED72A-003 owned by Kuyavian-Pomeranian Voivodeship at Toruń Kluczyki depot, January 2013.

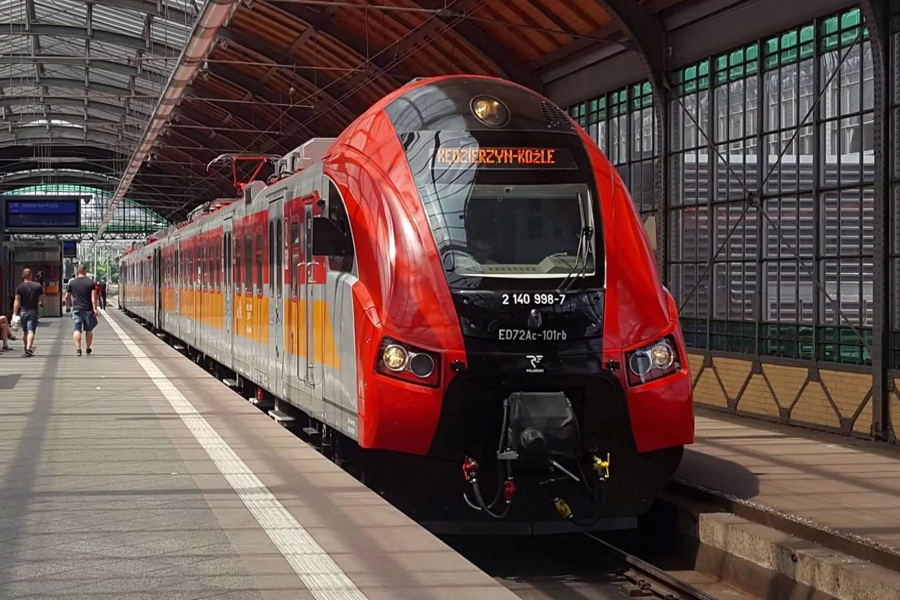
ED72Ac-101 at Wrocław Główny railway station, June 2018.

20 of the 21 ED72 units (except the last one) have been either rebuilt by ZNTK "Minsk Mazowiecki" and PESA Bydgoszcz or refurbished by Polregio Rolling Stock Repair Plant in Kruszewiec between 2011 and 2020. 6 units have been rebuilt to ED72A in 2011–2013, sporting a redesigned driver's cab design similar to rebuilt EN57 and EN71 "turbokibels", while another 6 units were rebuilt to ED72Ac in 2017–2018, sporting a much more streamlined driver's cab nose design somewhat reminiscent of the Pesa Elf. Both ED72A and ED72Ac units also had their original traction motors replaced with newer asynchronous ones, enabling an increase in maximum speed to 130 km/h (81 mph). Interior-only refurbishments were performed by the aforementioned Polregio Rolling Stock Repair Plant on the remaining 8 units, mainly including new bicycle racks.

== Resources ==
- Modern Locos Gallery
- Rail Service
- www.lokomotywy.prv.pl
- Mikoleje
- Chabówka Rail Museum

== See also ==
- Polish locomotives designation
