= PKP class EN57 =

Class of Polish electric multiple unit

PKP EN57
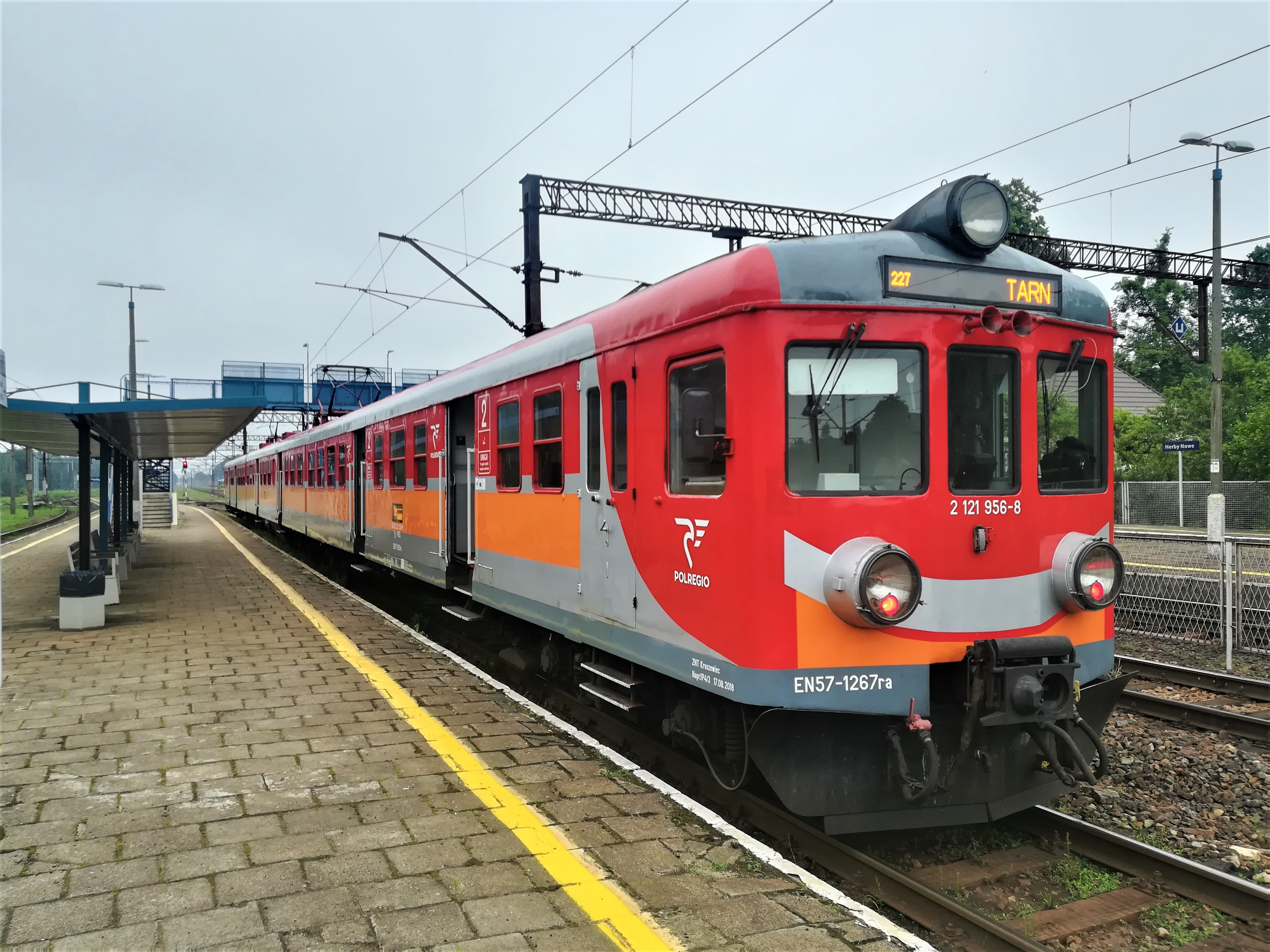
- EN57 in the new Polregio livery at Herby Nowe railway station, June 2020

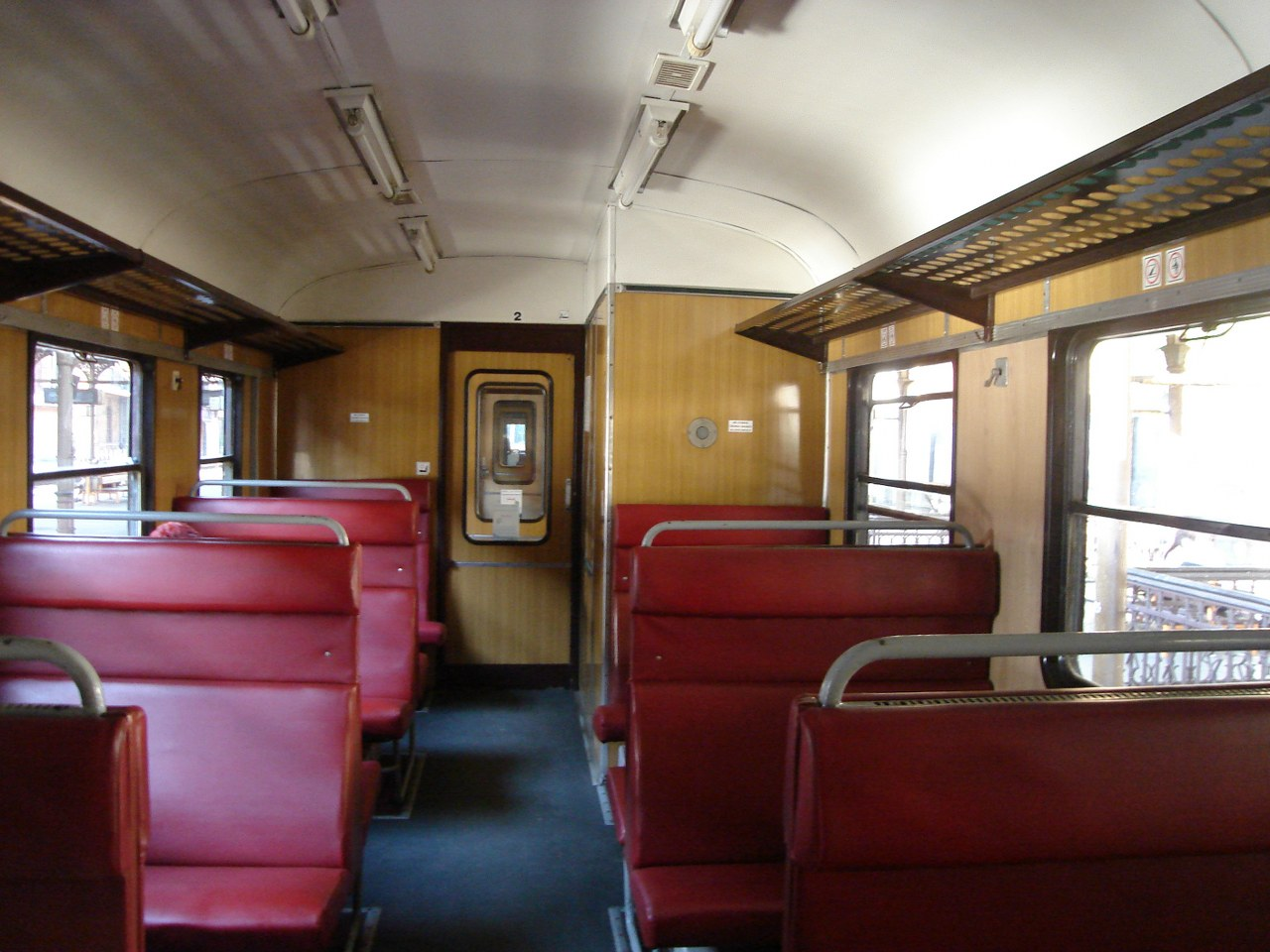
- EN57 interior in 2010
- Stock type: Electric multiple unit
- In service: 1962–1989 (Polish People's Republic) from 1989 (Poland); 1964–1991 (SFR Yugoslavia); 1991–2009 (Croatia); 1991–2021 (Slovenia)
- Manufacturer: Pafawag
- Family name: 5B/6B
- Constructed: 1961–1993
- Entered service: 2 February 1962
- Refurbished: H. Cegielski, Newag, Pesa SA, Polregio, Škoda, TS Opole, PKP Lokomotywownia Warszawa Grochów, SNiUT Gdynia Cisowa, ZNTK Mińsk Mazowiecki: 1993; 2006–present
- Scrapped: 1990–present
- Number built: 1452 trainsets
- Formation: 3 cars per trainset
- Operators: Polregio, KM, SKM Trójmiasto, KŚ, KD, KW, Yugoslav Railways, Hrvatske Željeznice, Slovenske železnice

Specifications
- Train length: 64.970 m (213 ft 2 in)
- Doors: 4
- Maximum speed: 110 / 120 km/h (68 / 75 mph)
- Weight: 123 tonnes (121 long tons; 136 short tons)
- Power output: 608 kW (815 hp)
- Transmission: LK450
- Electric system: 3000 V DC Overhead lines
- Current collection: Pantograph
- UIC classification: 2'2'+Bo'Bo'+2'2'
- Braking systems: Knorr; Oerlikon (later versions)
- Safety systems: Radio-Stop, SHP, CA
- Multiple working: EN71, ED72
- Track gauge: 1,435 mm (4 ft 8 1/2 in) standard gauge

The PKP Class EN57 (manufacturer's designation: Pafawag 5B/6B) is a type of electric multiple unit used by various operators of Poland. It was built for suburban and long-distance services. Presently it is used by Polregio, Tricity Rapid Urban Railway, Lower Silesian Railways, Silesian Railways, Greater Poland Railways and Masovian Railways companies in Poland.

== History ==
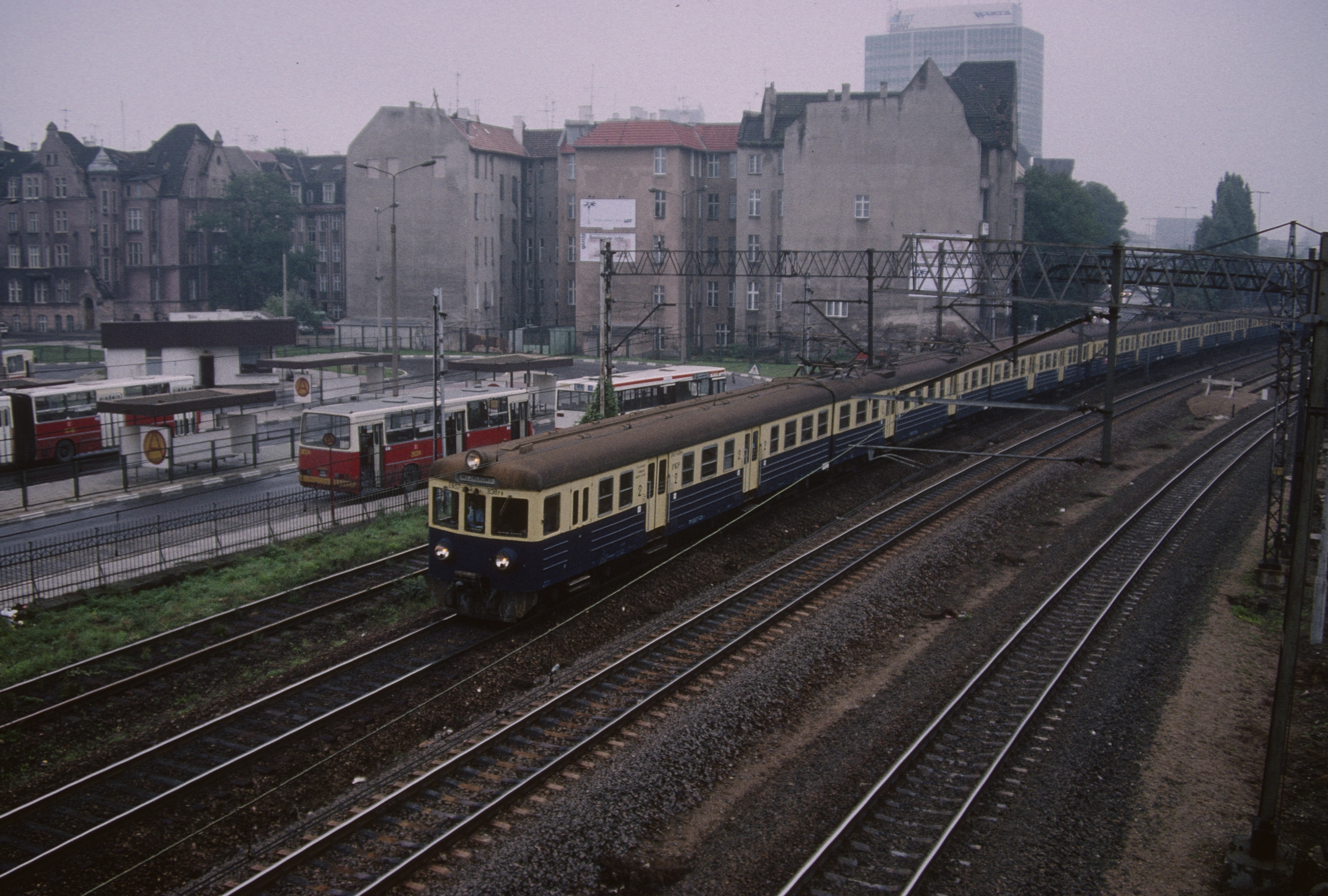
EN57-838ra pulling into Gdańsk, September 1994

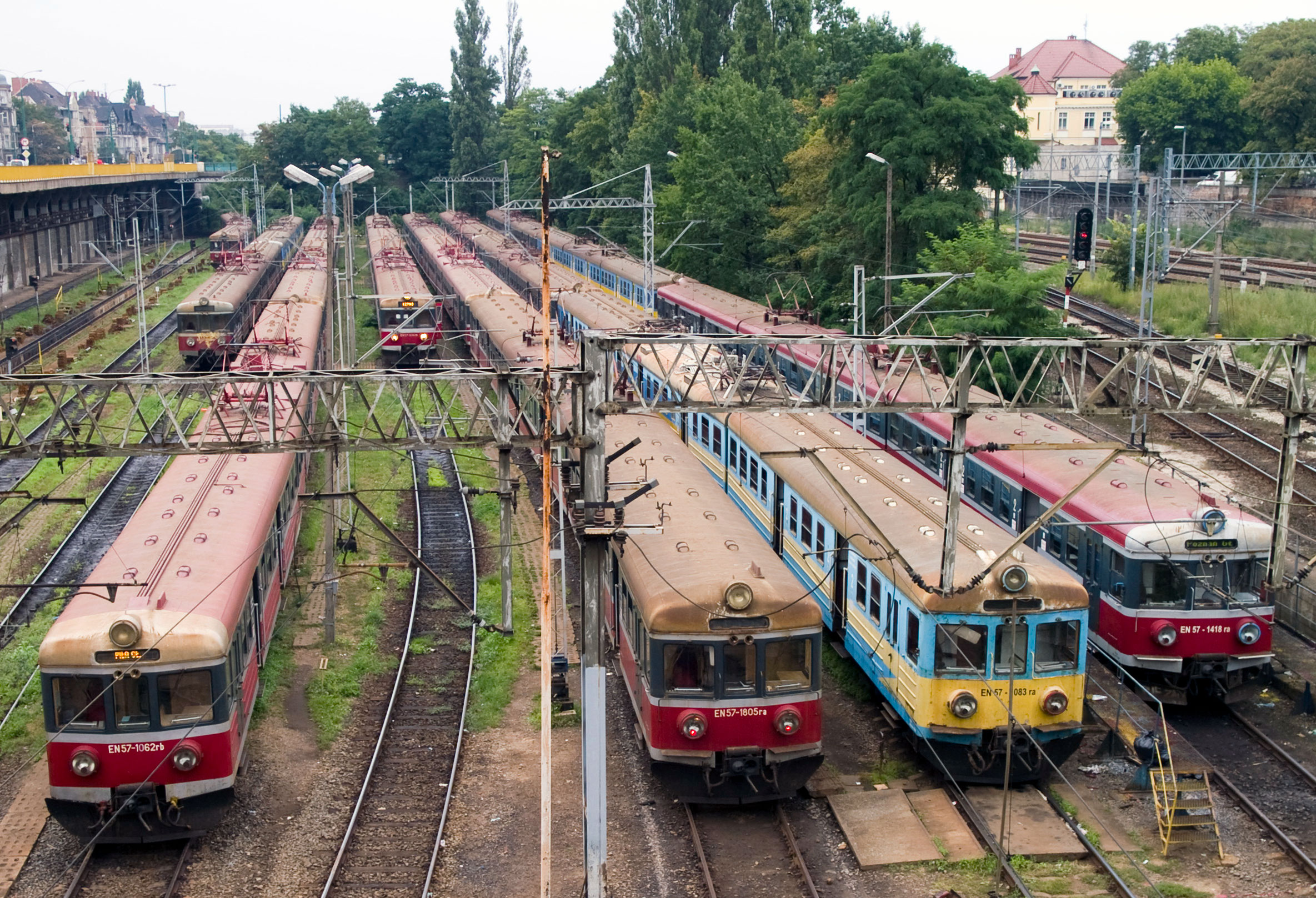
Several unmodernised 1st and 2nd generation EN57 units at Poznań Główny railway station in 2009

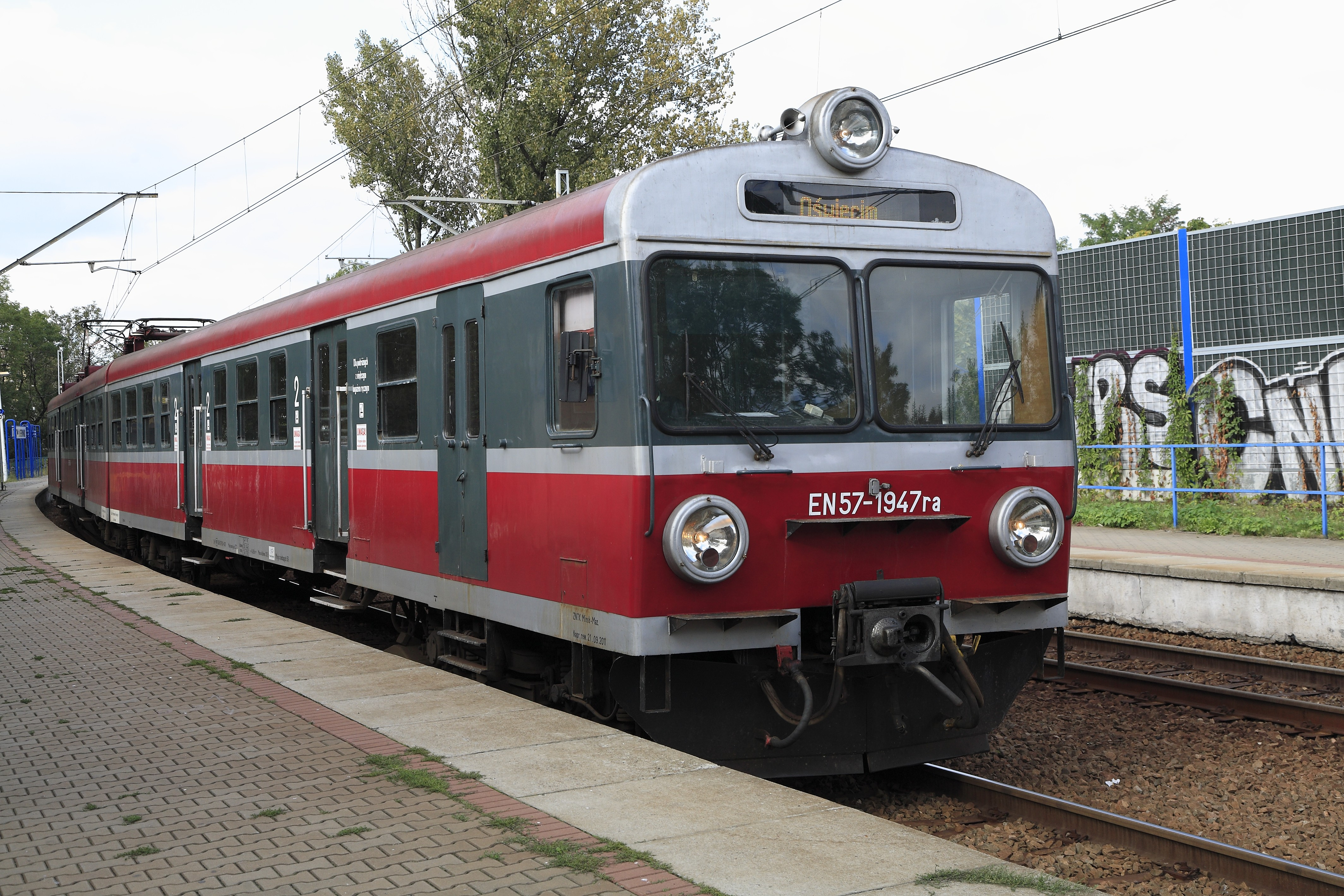
3rd generation EN57-1947 at Łagiewniki-Borek Fałęcki in 2012

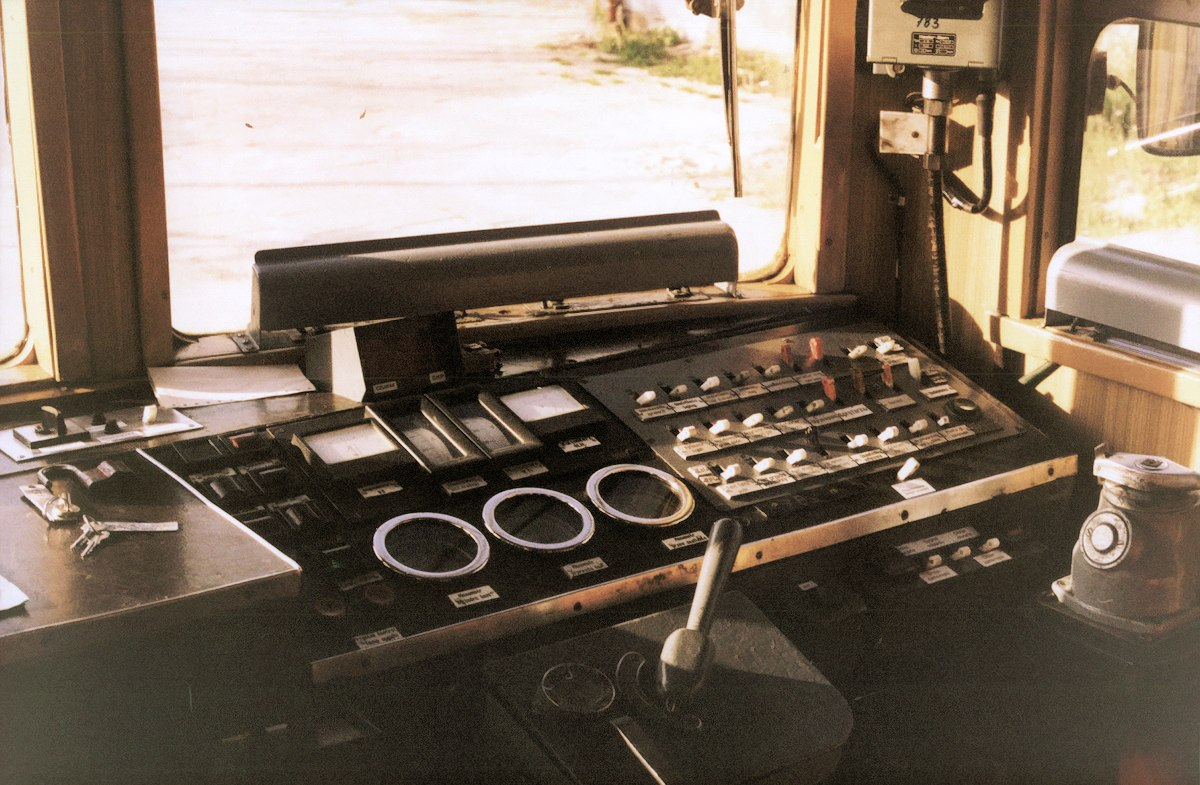
Driver's cab controls of 1st generation unit 783 in May 2003

Designed for regional transport, class EN57 was based on the earlier class EW55 units, which was the first electrical multiple unit train type built in Poland with 100% domestic components. They were built by Pafawag works in Wrocław.

Production started in 1961 and ended in 1993 with 1452 trainsets produced, many of which are still in operation. The first-generation units had first-class compartments, but units numbered 602 onwards were produced with only second class. Due to its extensive production period, the series varies between specific production spans. Units up to number 1113 have corrugated sides and three windscreens, units numbered 1114 to 1825 (second-generation) have flat sides and three windscreens, whilst units from number 1900 up to 1953 (third-generation) have flat sides and two windscreens, resembling class EW58 units.

Classes EN71, ED72, and ED73 units were based on class EN57. SKM Trójmiasto which operates service in the Tricity area uses these units and has also modernised them, mostly to the interior.

As a result of several fires and accidents, units numbered 201 to 206 were assembled from surviving cars of previously destroyed units. Since 2006, many EN57 units have been modernised with funding from the European Union. The changes affect the appearance of the units, with the ends being redesigned. The interior was also changed, and air-conditioning retrofit was done on many of said modernisations. Mechanical and electric devices remain mostly unchanged. Modified units are being renumbered from 2001 upwards.

== Technical data ==
EN57 is a three-car electric multiple unit with traction motors located in the middle car. The unit has four LK450 motors, each rated at 145 kW (194 hp). The outer two cars are both driving trailers and do not have motors. Trailers are distinguished with letters a and b, with part a including compressor and part b including the batteries.

Each part of the unit consists of three compartments, divided by corridors. In the trailers only two compartments are for passenger accommodation, while the third was thought to be luggage compartment. In the motor car, all three compartments are used by passengers. Originally, there were on-board toilets in all parts of the unit, but due to several fires caused by neighbouring electric devices, as well as their compressor inlets originally being located next to the toilets (hence spreading the odours around, likely leading to the "kibel" [lit. crapper] nickname applied since at least the 1980s), the toilets in the motor cars were removed. Class EN57 is capable of multiple unit operation with two or three units, using Scharfenberg couplers to connect units together. Each unit can seat up to 212 passengers.

== Service in other countries ==
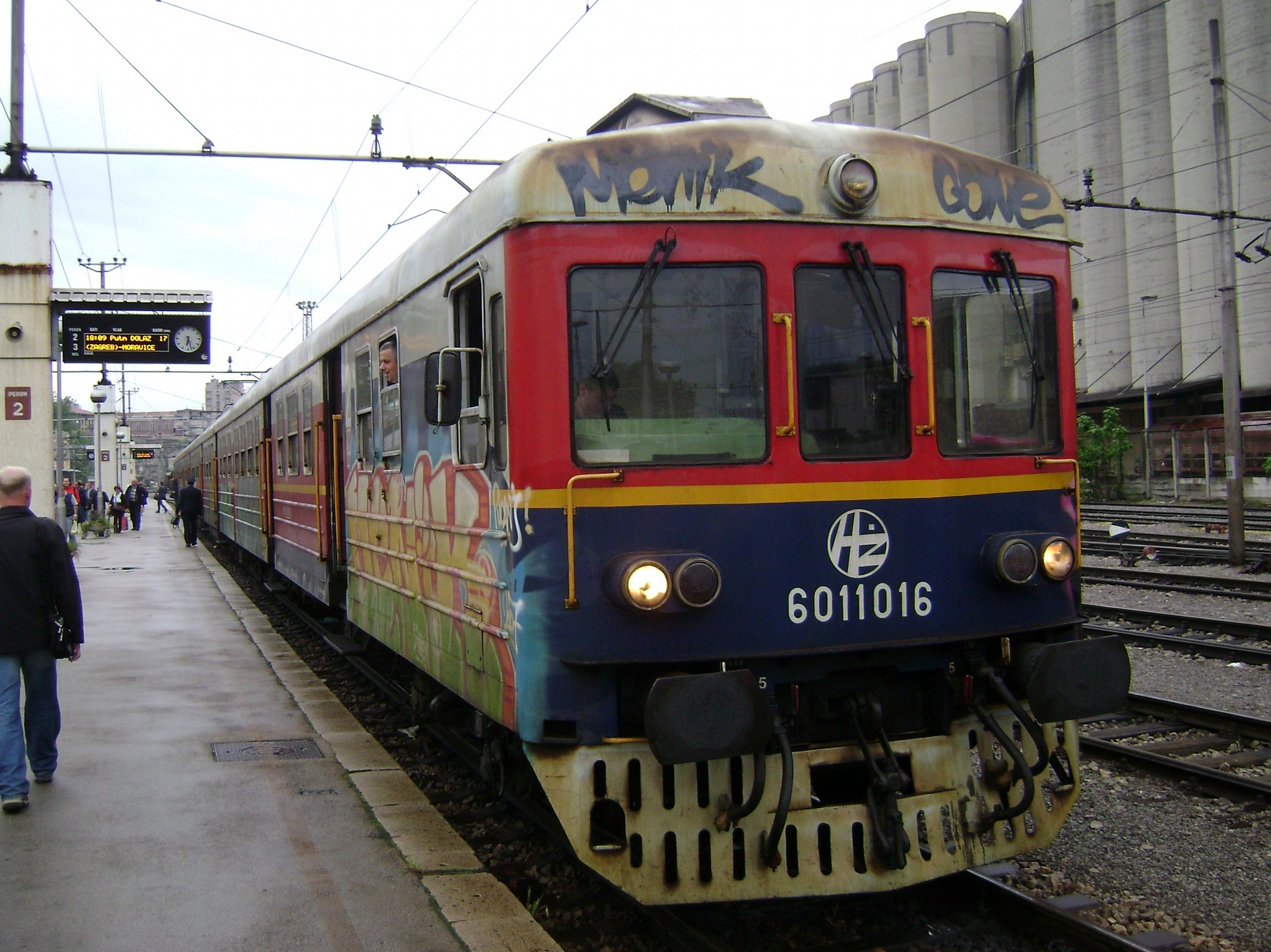
HŽ 6011 trainset at Rijeka, Croatia in 2008

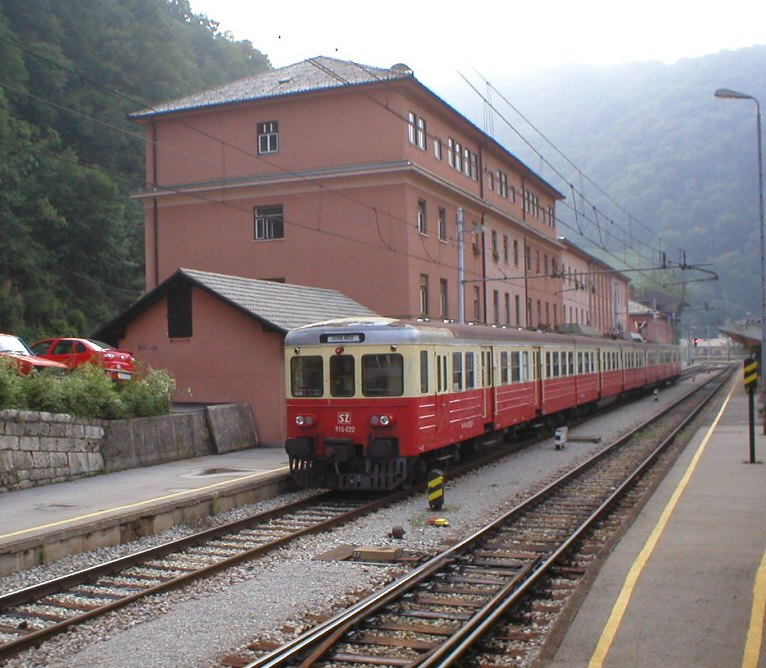
SŽ 315 trainset at Zidani Most, Slovenia in 2007

Three class EN57 units were exported to SFR Yugoslavia in 1964, where they were classified 311-0 (for trailers) and 315-0 (for motor cars). Another eleven were subsequently rebuilt from class 315-1 with additional fourth trailers. These units later remained in service in Slovenia and Croatia as SŽ 311/315 and HŽ 6011 respectively, until they were respectively withdrawn from service in 2021 and 2009. As in the time of delivery Władysław Gomułka was the leader of the Polish United Workers' Party, those units were nicknamed after him.

== Rebuilds and refurbishments ==
=== Exterior and interior (2006–2018; 2023– ) ===
Between 2006 and 2018, many extensive EN57 rebuilds were undertaken in which the driver's cab exteriors and headlights/taillights were replaced with new designs, among numerous other improvements, reusing only their underframes and bogies. This allowed to extend their lifespans by 15–20 years. These rebuilt trains are typically nicknamed "turbokibel" (lit. "turbocrapper").

==== SPOT/EN57-20XX ====
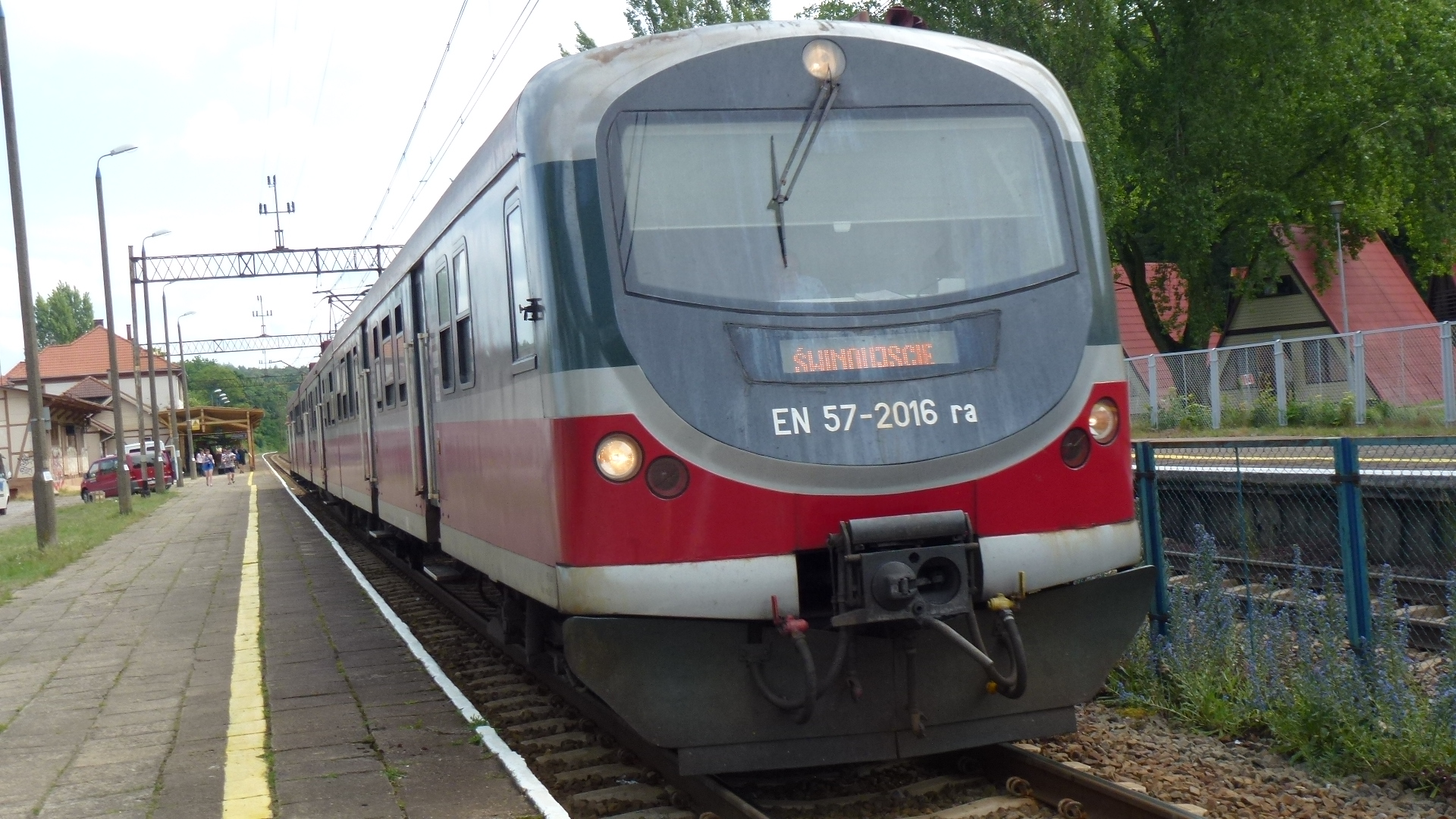
EN57-2016 at Międzyzdroje

In 2006, ZNTK "Mińsk Mazowiecki", Pesa Bydgoszcz and Newag Nowy Sącz begin rebuilding 75 EN57 units under the SPOT programme, financed by European Union funds. The modernised units feature updated end walls, driver's cabs, and interiors, as well as accessibility improvements such as elevators for wheelchair users and enlarged toilets. The separate service compartments were removed by connecting them with entrance hallways. These units after SPOT programme rebuild had also received alarms and 16 cameras. The original spinning transformer was replaced by an electronic transformer supplying 110 V DC, 230 V AC and 24 V DC power. These trainsets were given the numbering range 2001–2075, which was later changed to 2004–2078.

All SPOT rebuilt units will undergo another refurbishment conducted by ZNTK "Mińsk Mazowiecki" starting from 2023, to add on-board toilets in a closed system, air-conditioning in the passenger and driver cabs and CCTV cameras.

==== EN57KM ====
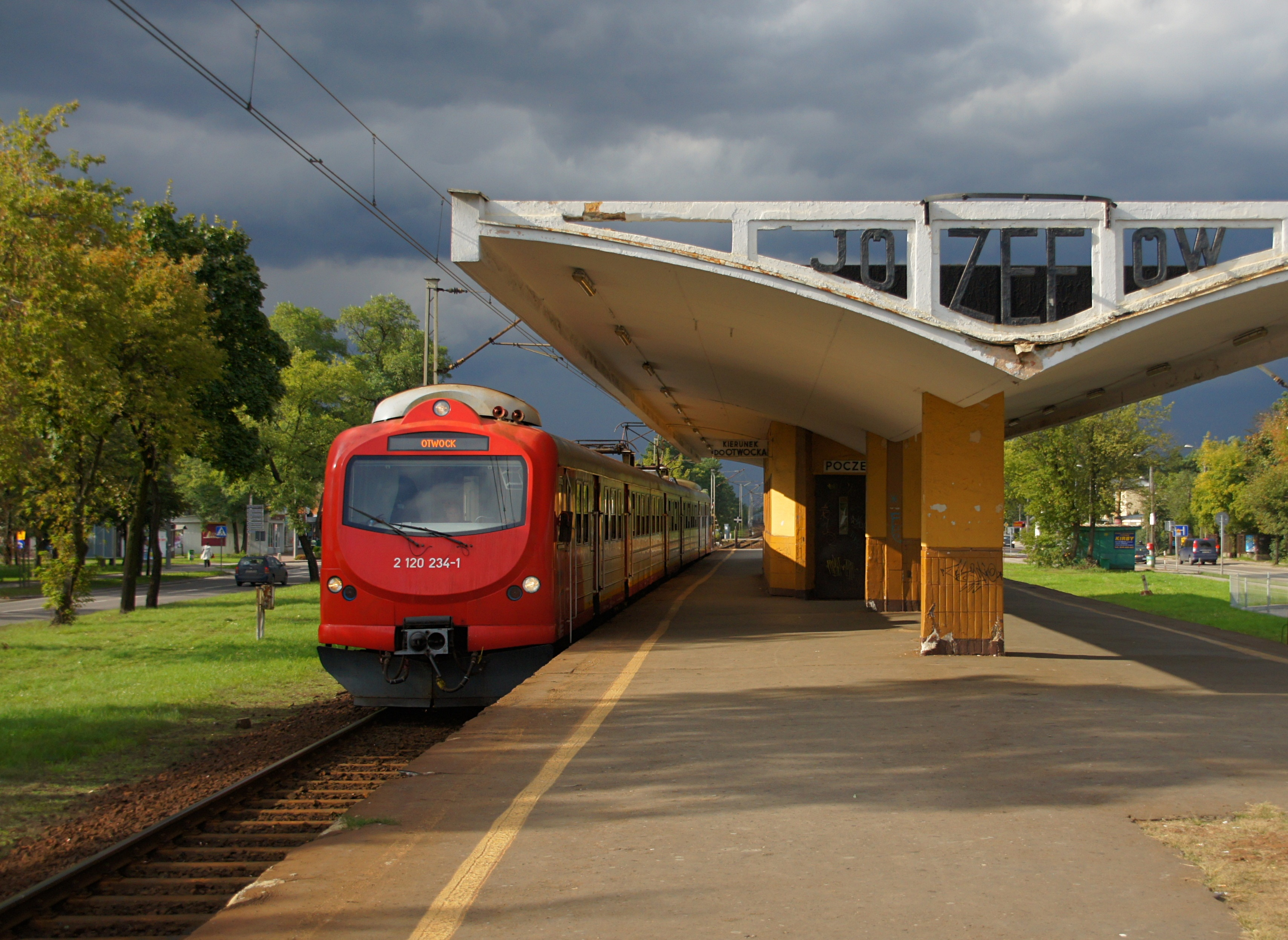
EN57KM-3002 at Józefów

In 2007 SKM Trójmiasto and Masovian Railways decided to apply the start pulse in some of their rebuilt EN57s:
SKM Trójmiasto: EN57-768, EN57-1089, EN57-1094 & EN57-1116
Masovian Railways: EN57-1486, EN57-1566, EN57-1567 & EN57-1562
ZNTK "Mińsk Mazowiecki" SA rebuilt these units. They too applied microprocessor controlled drive and electrodynamic braking.

==== EN57AKM ====
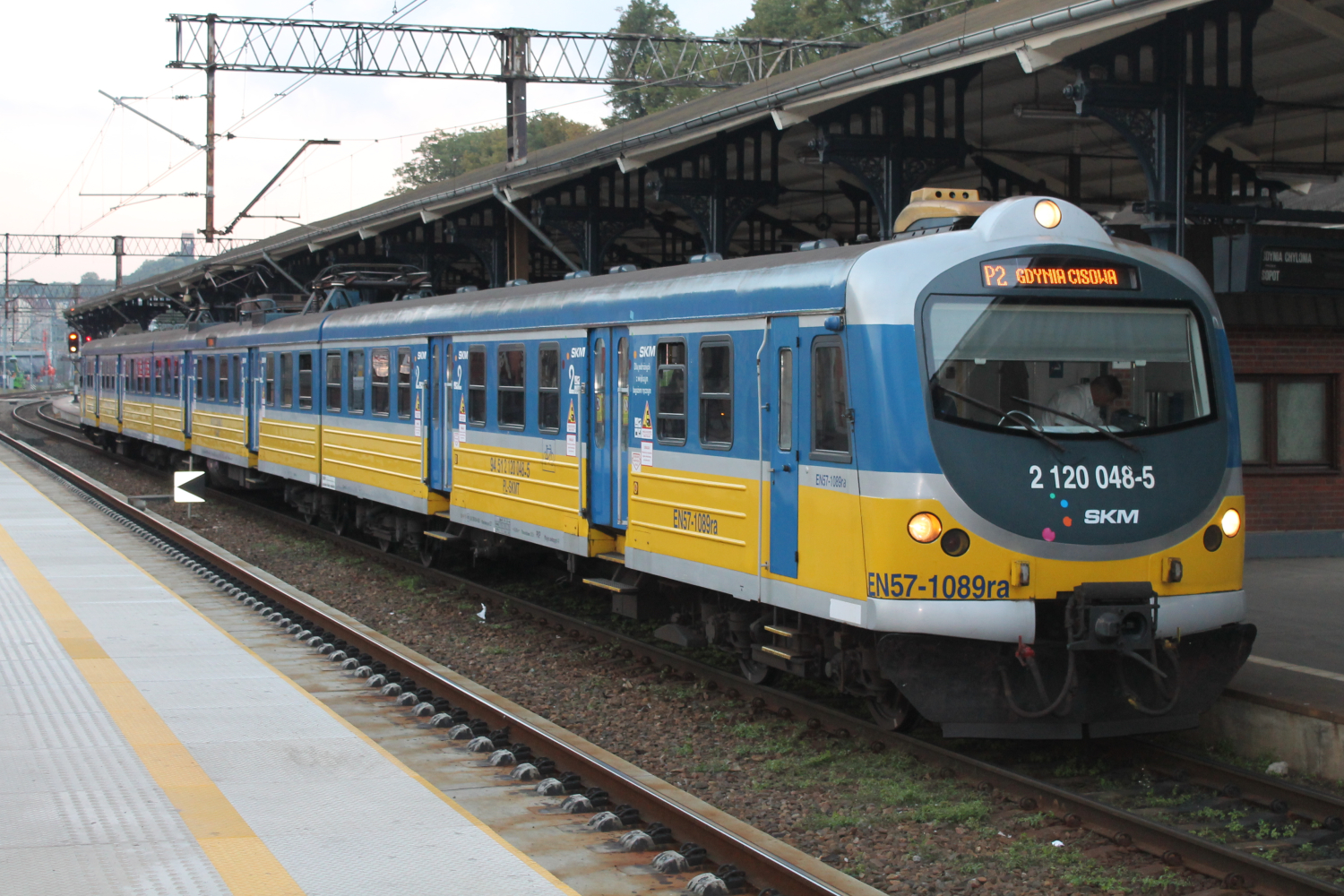
EN57AKM-1089 at Gdańsk Główny railway station

In 2008, Masovian Railways decided to rebuild 10 trainsets into EN57AKM, during which LK450X6 AC motors developed by EMIT in Żychlin were installed. These engines were built in old housings to avoid the need to change the final gears. The new engine has a power of 250 kW (340 hp), and the entire unit 1 MW (1,300 hp), which significantly improved the traction parameters of the vehicles – the acceleration of starting (up to 40 km/h [25 mph]) was increased to nearly 1 m/s^{2}, and the maximum speed was raised to 120 km/h (75 mph). Modernisations were carried out in the ZNTK "Mińsk Mazowiecki" plant (6 units in 2009–2010) and Newag Nowy Sącz (4 units in 2009), and the units modernised in this way were designated as EN57AKM.

At the same time, SKM Trójmiasto commissioned the rebuild of one EN71 unit based on similar assumptions – it was carried out in 2009 by Newag, and on 14–16 October 2009 the unit was presented at the TRAKO 2009 International Railway Fair in Gdańsk.

By July 2013, at a cost of PLN 351 million, another 21 EN57 units belonging to SKM Trójmiasto were to be rebuilt. This was to be carried out within 14 months by a consortium of Tabor Szynowy Opole (TS Opole) and Škoda Transportation; however, due to the bankruptcy of TS Opole, only one unit (EN57AKM-1718) was rebuilt. In the re-tender for the rebuild of the remaining 20 units for SKM Trójmiasto, the most advantageous offer was submitted by the consortium of Pesa Bydgoszcz SA and ZNTK "Mińsk Mazowiecki" SA, which undertook said rebuild for approx. PLN 124 million. After the rebuild, these trains' top speeds were increased to 120 km/h (75 mph), with accommodations and ramps for disabled people. They are equipped with air conditioning (only in the driver cabs), toilets in a closed system, CCTVs and passenger information system (on monitors and audiovisual).

==== EN57AKŁ ====
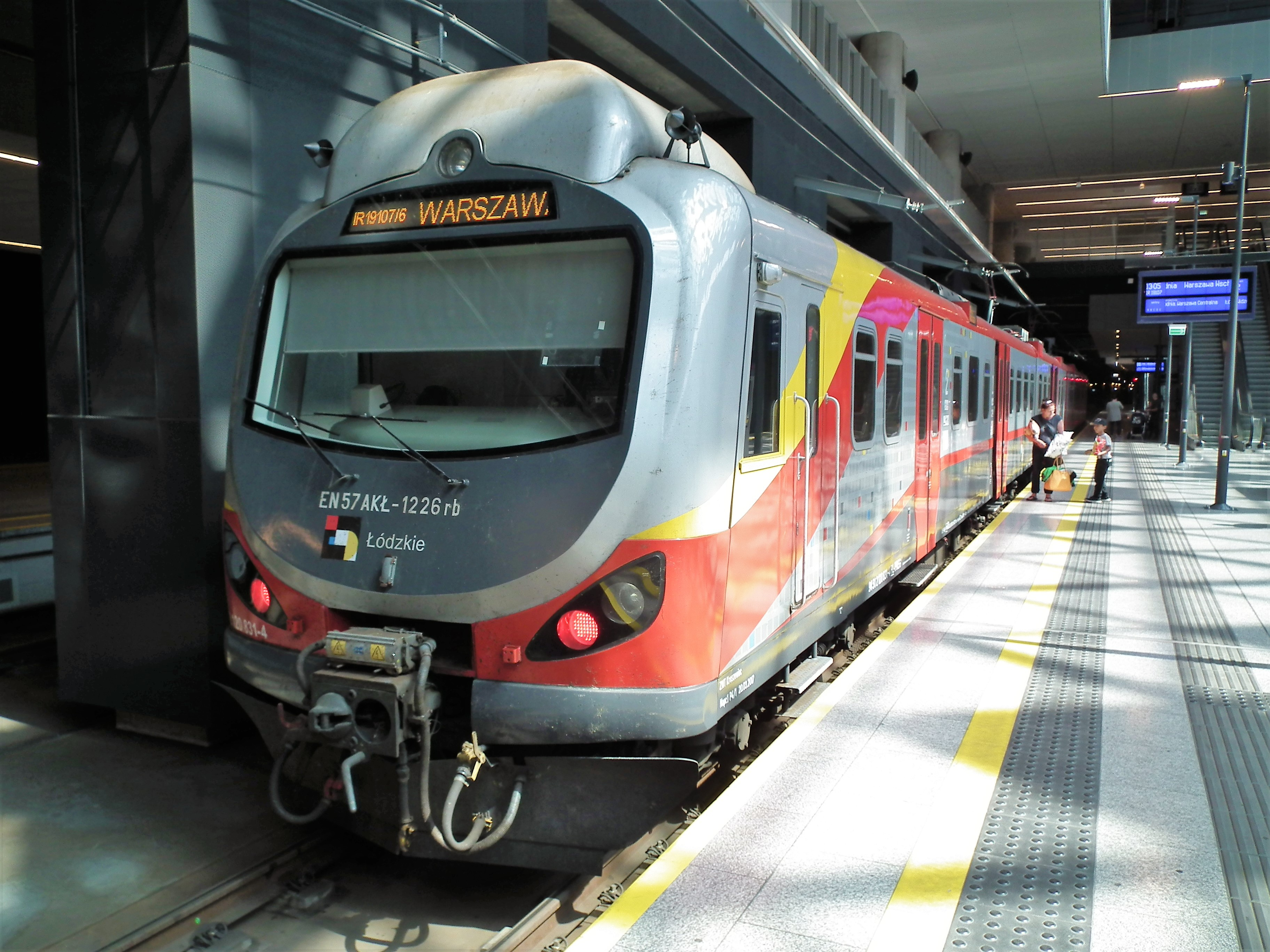
EN57AKŁ-1226 at Łódź Fabryczna railway station

Between 2011 and 2012, Newag rebuilt four EN57 units for Lodzian branch of Polregio on the basis of a contract awarded on 29 July 2011 worth PLN 31.4 million; these units were designated as EN57AKŁ. Deliveries lasted from December 2011 to May 2012. The rebuilt trains are units 1226, 1452, 1044 and 1479. Alternating current asynchronous motors were installed in the vehicles, which allowed to increase the maximum speed to 120 km/h (75 mph). The units are also equipped with air conditioning in both the driver cabs and passenger interiors, two toilets in a closed system and power sockets at the passenger seats. The driver's cab controls were also modernised, the appearance of the front of the cab was changed and the original sliding doors were replaced with plug doors.

==== EN57AL, EN57AKW, EN57AKD, EN57AKŚ, EN57AP, EN57FPS ====
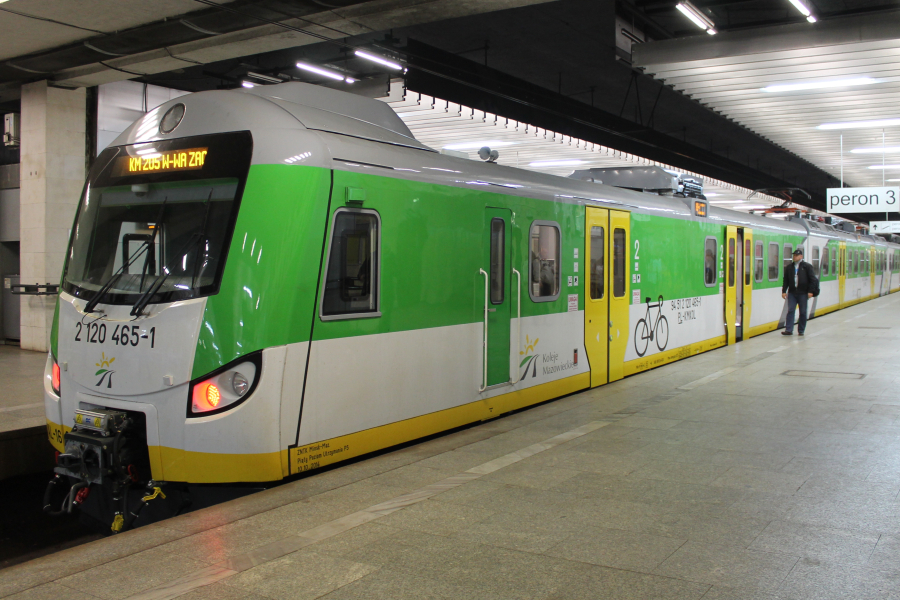
EN57AL-1667 at Warszawa Śródmieście railway station

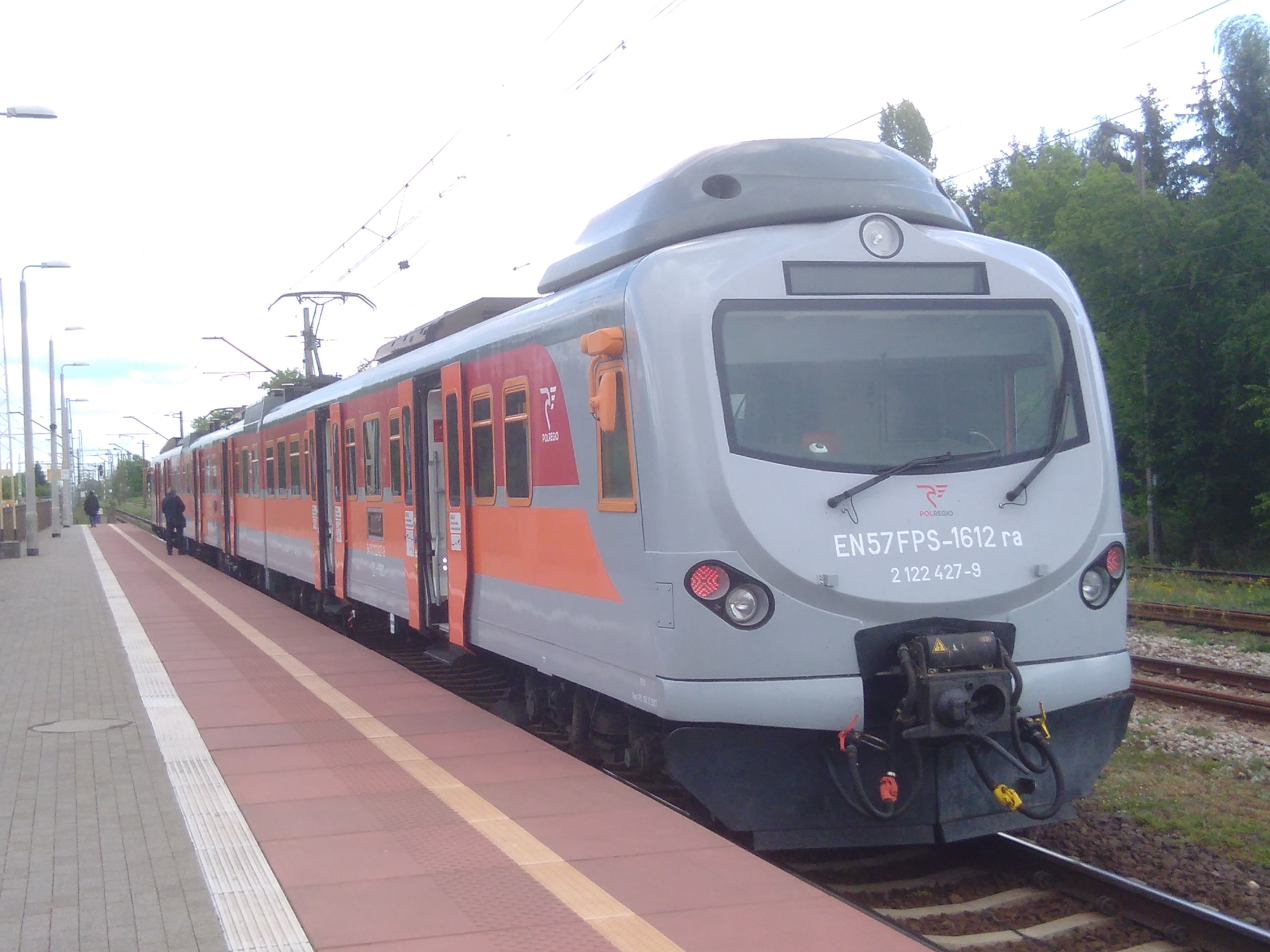
EN57FPS-1612 at Poznań Krzesiny railway station

From 2011 to 2018, rebuilds into EN57AL (+ ALc & ALd), EN57AKW, EN57AKD, EN57AKŚ, EN57AP and EN57FPS took place in the same range or similar to the above-mentioned EN57AKŁ. They are given various designations: EN57AL (the letter L was initially supposed to symbolise Lubelskie, now this designation can also be found on rebuilt Dolnośląskie, Mazowieckie, Opolskie, Pomorskie and Podlaskie units), EN57AKW (letter W symbolising Wielkopolska) or EN57AKŚ (Ś symbolising Śląskie). The original motors are replaced with newer asynchronous ones (in the designation they are symbolised by the letter A), the trains are equipped with air conditioning in both the driver cabs and passenger interiors, ecological toilets in a closed system, blinds in windows, LCD monitors, power sockets and (on many 2013–2018 modernisations) free on-board Wi-Fi. Seats are replaced with ergonomic ones, the seating arrangement is changed and trains are equipped with a new braking system, improving the smoothness of driving. The AL/ALc/ALd versions for Lubelskie are equipped with on-board ticket machines, while the AKŚ units have on-board vending machines selling snacks and drinks for travellers.

EN57FPS (Feniks 57) refers to some of the last and most extensive "turbokibel" rebuilds of twenty EN57 units, done by H. Cegelski between 2015 and 2018 under contract by Polski Tabor Szynowy, Polregio and Silesian Railways. Their top speed was similarly increased to 120 km/h (75 mph), and their added features are similar to EN57AL, except that they have distinctive grey-coloured base liveries on the front.

Another one of the last notable "turbokibel" rebuilds was EN57-1785, which was purchased by ZNTK "Mińsk Mazowiecki" SA from Masovian Railways as a surplus trainset in May 2018 and subsequently rebuilt into EN57ALc-1785. The rebuilt, estimated at a cost of just over PLN 12 million, was said to be the most expensive rebuild of a single EN57 trainset ever. The unit was subsequently handed over to the ownership of the Marshal's Office of the Warmian–Masurian Voivodeship in October 2018, who then contracted out its operations to Polregio.

=== Interior only (1993; 2010–present) ===
Due to the higher cost of undertaking the aforementioned extensive rebuilds of EN57 units into "turbokibels", some units have received less extensive modernisations since 2010, primarily affecting their interiors with some slight exterior changes. To keep costs low, features such as air conditioning, power sockets and sometimes CCTVs and on-board toilets are often omitted from such modernisations.

==== EN57-1912 to-1917 (1993) ====
In 1993, the first refurbishment of EN57 trains (units 1912 to 1917) were undertaken by ZNTK "Mińsk Mazowiecki" SA at the PKP workshops at Grochów, to convert them to longer-distance Interregio trains, serving the route Warsaw–Kielce. In 2005, these cars were transferred to Masovian Railways, who then used these as a summertime "Słoneczny" train to Gdynia.

==== EN57-1703 "ENdolino" ====
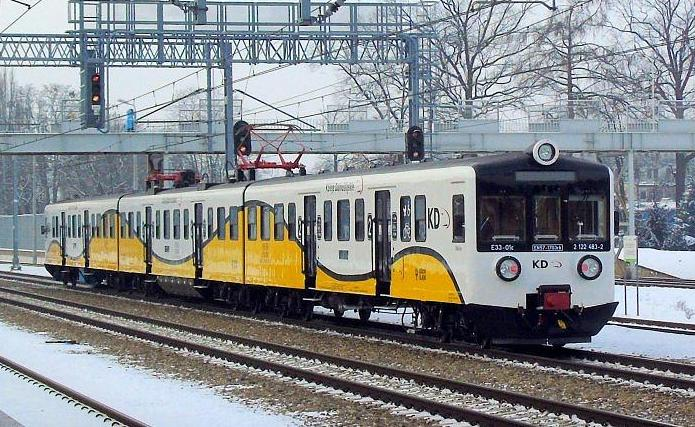
EN57-1703 at Grodzisk Mazowiecki in the new Lower Silesian Railways livery

In 2016, Lower Silesian Railways contracted ZNTK "Mińsk Mazowiecki" SA to refurbish EN57-1703, in which the area of the cab windshields were optically increased by applying black paint, which gave the front of the vehicle a modern look. For this reason, the unit was nicknamed "ENdolino".

== Preserved units ==
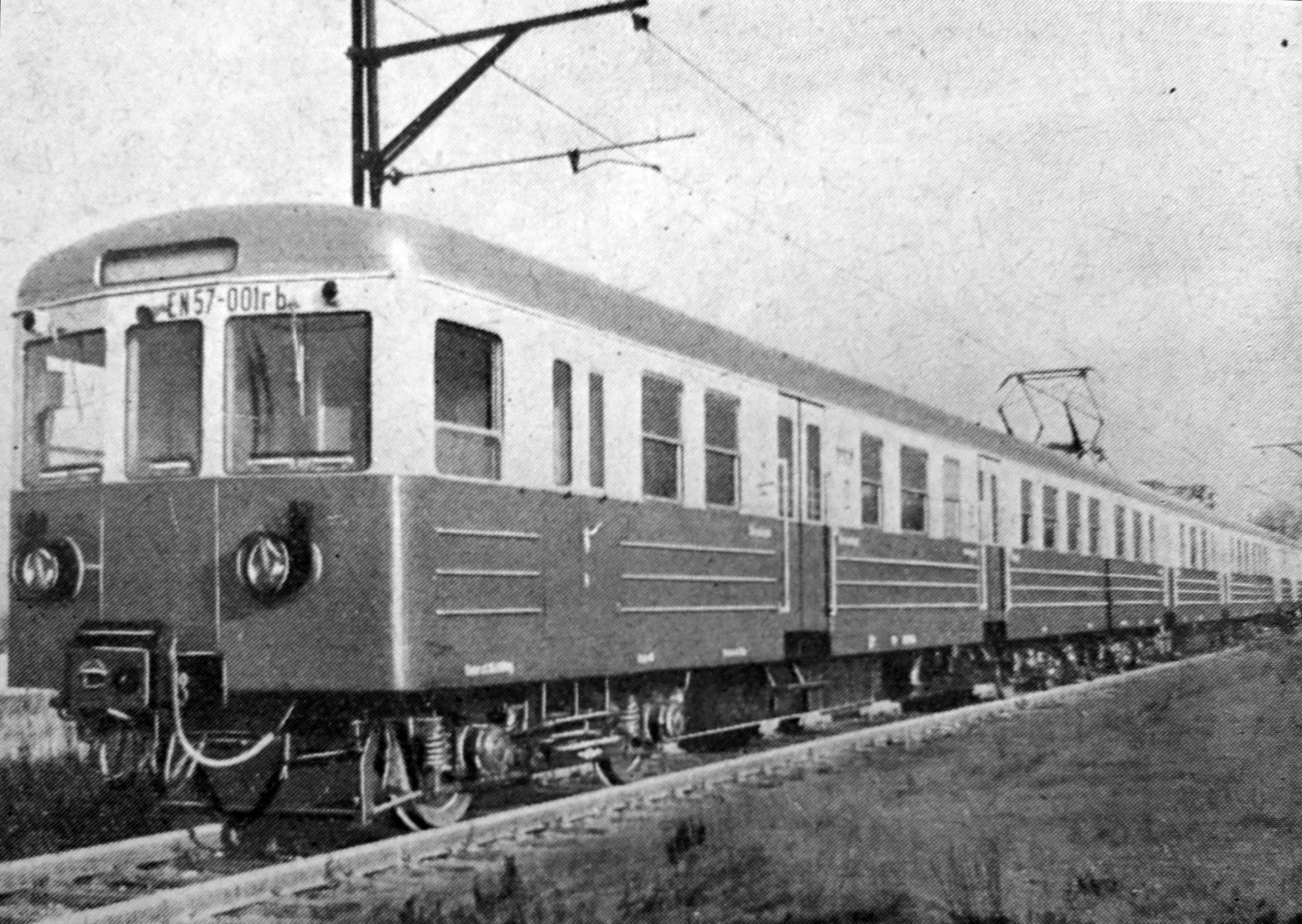
EN57-001, the first produced EN57 trainset

EN57-001 (the first production EN57 trainset), has since 2017 been preserved in Przeworsk under the protection of a conservator. Bearing in mind the value of the vehicle from the point of view of the history and development of the railway industry in Poland, the management board of Przewozy Regionalne had already in 2016 decided to withdraw the earlier decision to scrap this unit, which last saw revenue service in 2009.

== See also ==
- Polish locomotives designation
- Szybka Kolej Miejska
- 14WE A heavily reconstructed version of EN57, developed in mid-2000s
