= Grabica =

Grabica may refer to the following places in Poland:

- Grabica, Łask County, Łódź Voivodeship
- Gmina Grabica, Piotrków County, Łódź Voivodeship
  - Grabica, Piotrków County, a village in the gmina
