= Cisowa =

Cisowa may refer to the following places:

- Cisowa, Gdynia (north Poland)
- Cisowa, Kędzierzyn-Koźle (south Poland)
- Cisowa, Łódź Voivodeship (central Poland)
- Cisowa, Silesian Voivodeship (south Poland)
- Cisowa, Subcarpathian Voivodeship (south-east Poland)
- Cisowa, Lubusz Voivodeship (west Poland)
