= Gutów =

Gutów may refer to:

- Gutów, Greater Poland Voivodeship, Poland
- Gutów, Masovian Voivodeship, Poland
- Gutów Duży, Łódź Voivodeship, Poland
- Gutów Mały, Łódź Voivodeship, Poland

== See also ==
- Gutow (disambiguation)
- Gutowo (disambiguation)
