= PKP class EW60 =

Electric multiple unit produced by Pafawag

EW60
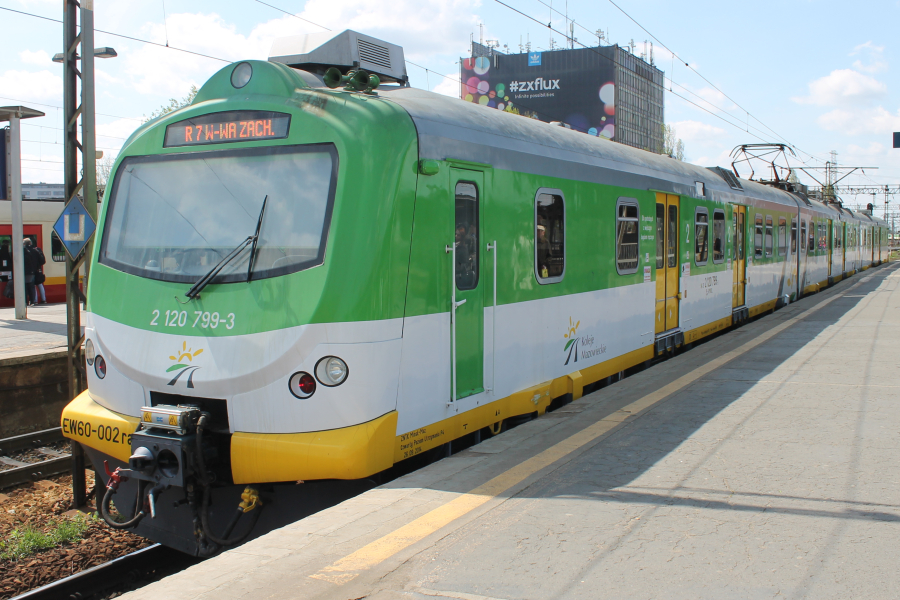
- EW60-002 after the second modernization at the Warszawa Zachodnia station
- Stock type: electric multiple unit
- Manufacturer: Pafawag
- Assembly: Wrocław, Poland
- Constructed: 1990
- Number built: 2
- Capacity: before modernization: 585; after modernization: 577

Specifications
- Train length: 6,480 mm (255 in)
- Width: 2,800 mm (110 in)
- Height: 3,900 mm (150 in)
- Platform height: 1,180 mm (46 in)
- Wheel diameter: new: 1,000 mm (39 in); worn: 920 mm (36 in)
- Maximum speed: 120 km/h (75 mph)
- Weight: 129 t (284,000 lb)
- Engine type: LKa-435
- Power output: 4×206 kW
- Acceleration: 0.8–1.1 m/s²
- Braking system(s): electrodynamic, pneumatic, electro-pneumatic

Pafawag 6WE and 6WEb (with car types 404B+302B+405B and 404Bb+302Bb+405Bb, classified as series EW60) are standard-gauge, three-car electric multiple units produced in Poland. They were manufactured in a quantity of 2 units at the Pafawag factory in Wrocław in 1990 for Szybka Kolej Miejska in the Tricity area. Since 2007, these units have been operated by Masovian Railways.

== History ==
=== Origins ===
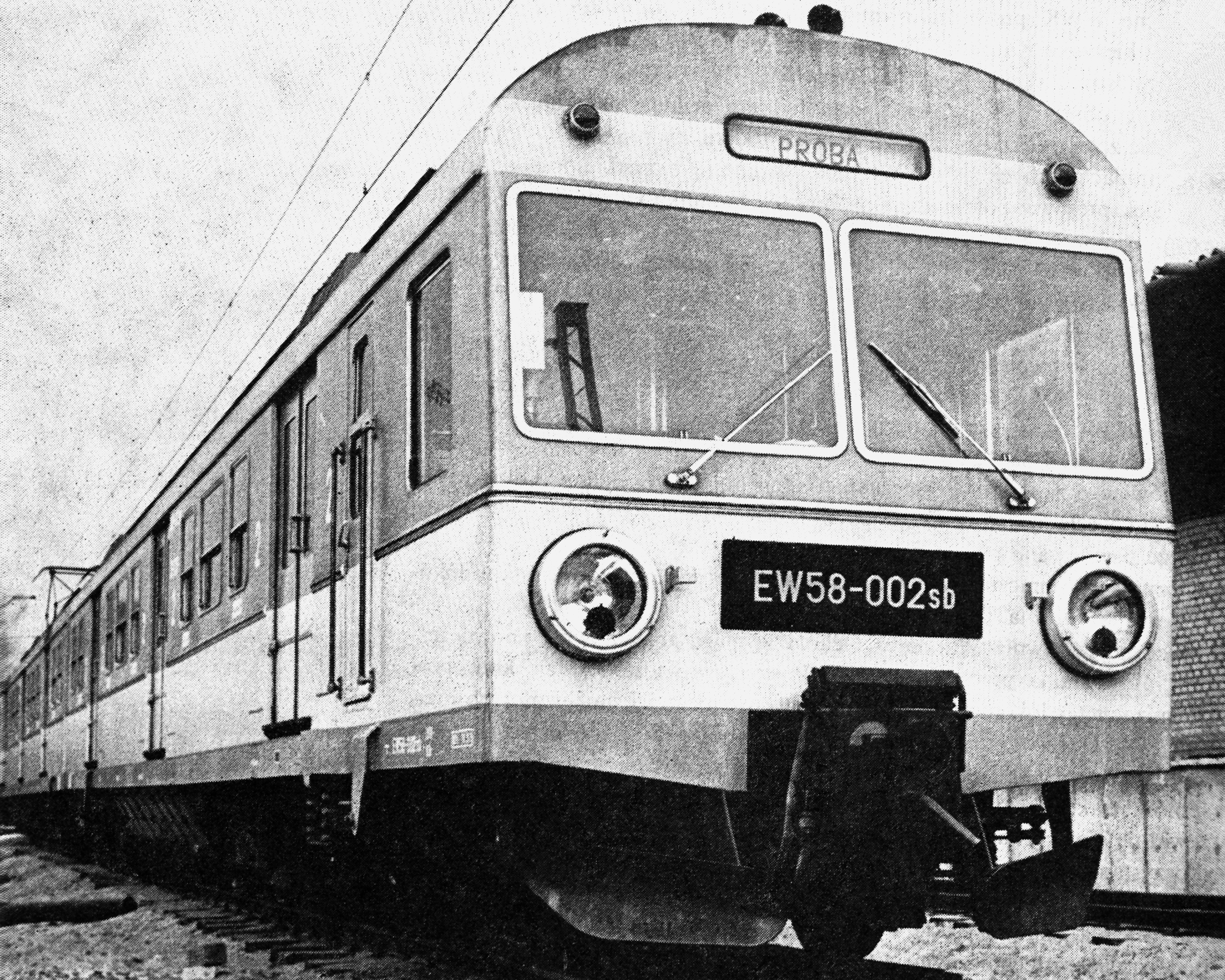
EW58 unit, which served as the foundation for the development of the EW60 units

In the mid-1960s, the electric multiple units (EMUs) in operation in Poland, which had been designed according to pre-World War II standards, were becoming increasingly outdated compared to foreign vehicles. As a result, during the 1960s and 1970s, the Railway Scientific and Technical Centre undertook projects for new EMUs intended for both urban and long-distance services. During this period, designs for urban units of the 2WE and 3WE types were developed, with the 3WE model, later designated by Polish State Railways as the EW58 series, being prioritized for production. The 2WE project, however, was postponed for later consideration.

During the production of the EW58 units, the idea emerged to build new EMUs that would address the initial critical feedback received from their operation. Szybka Kolej Miejska in Tricity identified several flaws, the most significant being the quality of the prototype equipment and the high power consumption due to the increased number of motors and the way they were connected. However, the EW58 units were also recognized for their advantages, such as significantly better acceleration, a higher number of doors facilitating quick passenger exchange, and the absence of steps, which was a major issue with the EN57 units used by Szybka Kolej Miejska, especially for serving lower platforms than the 960 mm above rail level standard of Tricity.

=== Design ===
On 20 November 1979, the Central Design Bureau for Railway Rolling Stock completed a concept that proposed four variants for the new unit:

Type	Car arrangement	Type of traction motors	Maximum speed
3WE-120	s+d+s		120 km/h
3WE-100	s+d+s		100 km/h
2WE-100	r+s+r	LKa-435 (as in EW58)	100 km/h
2WE-6B	r+s+r	LKf-450 (as in EN57)	100 km/h

The design office, which authored these concepts, deemed the 3WE-100 variant as the most appropriate solution. Considering energy efficiency, the 2WE-100 variant was also considered, while the 2WE-6B variant was dismissed due to its outdated design.

On 7 January 1980, during a meeting attended by representatives from Central Design Bureau, Pafawag, the Railway Scientific and Technical Centre, and the Northern and Central Regional Directorates of State Railways, the 2WE-100 variant was favored for its traction and energy consumption advantages. In March of the same year, Central Design Bureau prepared the construction assumptions for the new vehicle, which was to be developed in two versions: a regional version with toilets (type 2WE, designated EN59) and a metropolitan version without toilets (type 6WE, designated EW60). Subsequently, the centre began the actual design work. In 1980, the construction documentation for the 2WE unit was completed and handed over to the manufacturer. It was then planned that the 6WE unit's documentation would be completed the following year, but ultimately, this design was finalized in 1982. The mechanical part of the project was designed by engineer Perek, while the electrical part was designed by Eugeniusz Małecki.

=== Production ===
In 1980, during the design phase, it was planned that the first three prototypes of the 6WE units would be ready for operation by the second quarter of 1983. Serial production was expected to begin at the Pafawag plant between 1983 and 1985, with around 500 units to be produced by 1990, followed by an annual production of between 20 and 30 units thereafter. The 2WE units were scheduled to enter production starting in 1985. However, the country's economic difficulties led to significant delays from the original timeline. By 1986, two prototype 6WE units were under construction, with the manufacturer predicting their delivery for testing in the first half of 1987.

As per the initial plans, the 6WE unit was developed with a resistor-based start-up system. Additionally, a more advanced version, the 6WEa, was designed with a thyristor-based pulse start-up system. For testing purposes, this system was installed in the EW58-018sa car in 1984, while the second powered car retained the resistor-based system. By 1988, after completing these tests, it was concluded that the thyristor system was not suitable for mass production, and the new units would continue to use the resistor-based start-up system. It was also decided that the production of the 6WEa version, developed under the Central Research and Development Program, would begin in 1993. By 1990, the plan to produce a prototype of this vehicle by 1993 was still in place, although there was consideration of bypassing this step and moving directly to producing a new generation of EMUs.

Ultimately, two prototype 6WE units were completed in 1990. The first unit, EW60-001, was finished on May 7, and the second, EW60-002, on July 5.

=== End of production ===
After the production of the two prototype units, Pafawag proposed to Polish State Railways the production of 40 EW60 units with a resistor-based start-up system, with the possibility of later upgrading to a pulse system. However, Polish State Railways rejected this proposal. The production of the 2WE and 6WEa units was never initiated.

== Construction ==
=== Body ===
The EW60 is a three-car, high-platform trainset designed for suburban passenger transport. The end cars are control cars (types 404B and 405B, later modernized for Masovian Railways as 404Bb and 405Bb), designated as ra and rb (control car a and b), while the middle car is a railcar (type 302B, later modernized as 302Bb), designated as s. Each car features four pairs of sliding passenger doors (with a width of 1,180 mm) on each side, along with additional doors providing direct access to the driver's cabins. The entrances are designed without steps to facilitate boarding from low platforms. The two units can be coupled together in multiple unit operation, but only with each other.

=== Interior and passenger space ===
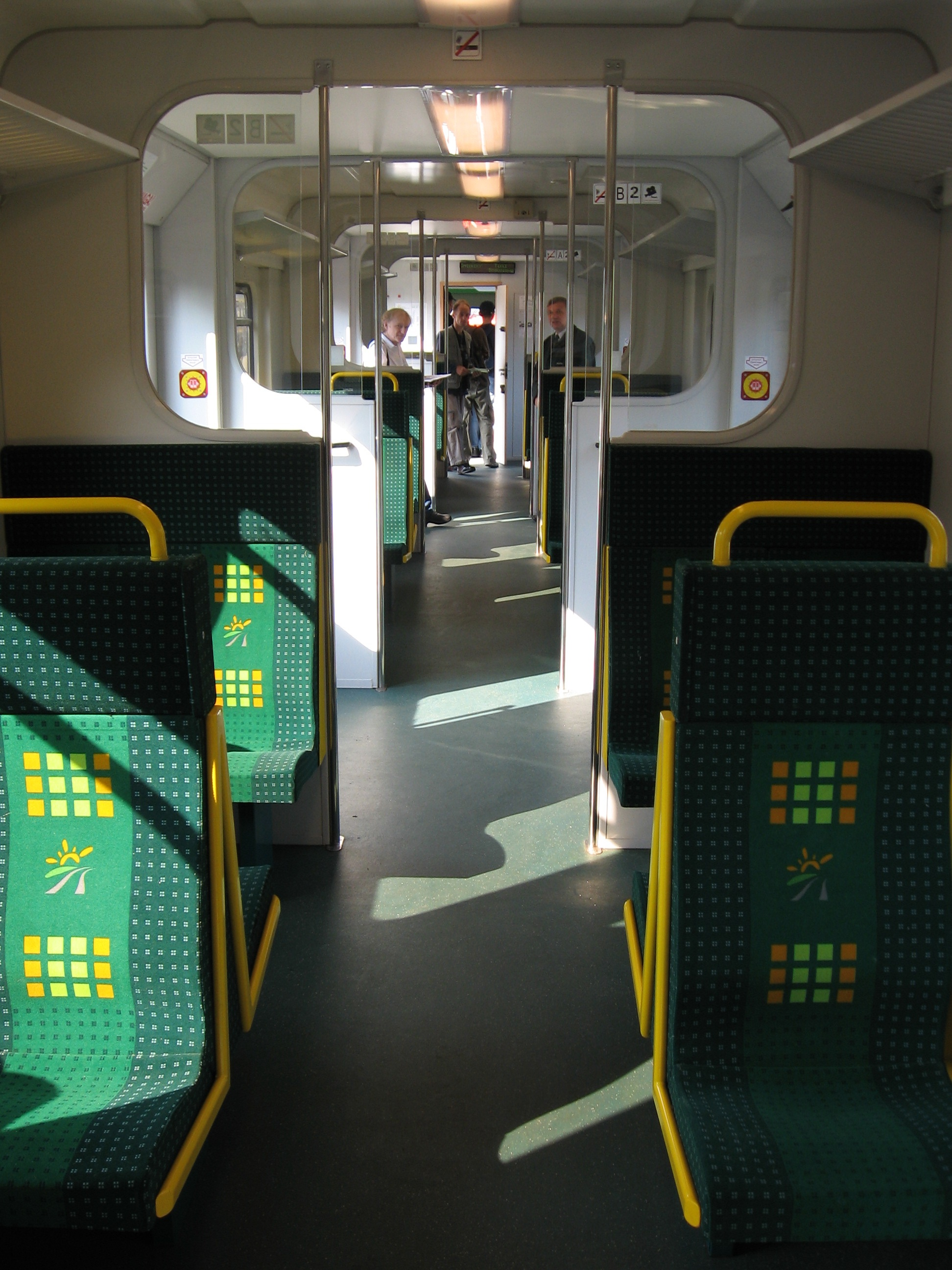
Interior of EW60 after the first modernization

The interior of the EW60 is open-plan and equipped with windbreaks. The train has 164 plastic seats arranged in a group seating layout. There are no toilets on board. The windows in the passenger area are divided into two sections – the lower section is larger to provide better visibility, while the upper section features a small tilting pane.

=== Underframe ===
Each of the end cars rests on two 9ANd bogies with a wheelbase of 2,500 mm and a wheel diameter of 1,000 mm. The middle car is supported by two powered 3MNd bogies, also with a wheelbase of 2,500 mm and a wheel diameter of 1,000 mm. The distance between the pivot points of each car is 15,040 mm.

=== Power supply and drive ===
The EW60 operates on 3,000 V DC supplied via an overhead line, with power collected by two symmetrical current collectors (types AKP-4E or 5ZL) mounted on the roof of the middle car. The power is used to drive four traction motors, mounted in pairs on the railcar’s bogies.

The EW60 is equipped with a resistor-based start-up system, Oerlikon electro-pneumatic brakes, and dynamic resistor brakes (without the ability to regenerate energy back to the overhead line).

=== Modernizations ===
==== 2006–2007 ====
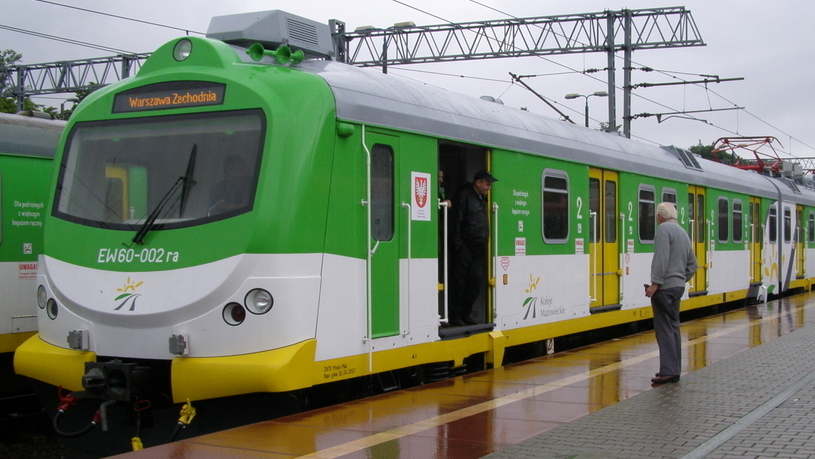
EW60-002 after the first modernization

Between 2006 and 2007, both EW60 units underwent a major overhaul combined with modernization at Pesa factory in Mińsk Mazowiecki. This included the installation of a pulse start-up system, a new braking system, and improved cooling for the traction motors. The interior was upgraded with features like monitoring, forced-air heating, bike racks, pneumatically operated inter-car doors, and spaces for disabled passengers, including a ramp for easier boarding and an adapted closed-system toilet. The train also received a new front design, and the driver's cabins were modernized, including the installation of air conditioning. The modernization reduced the number of seats to 147, and the original plastic seats were replaced with green upholstered seats, similar to those in most Masovian Railways units. Following these updates, the units were reclassified as 6WEb.

==== 2012–2014 ====
On 13 July 2012, a tender was announced for a fourth-level maintenance overhaul, combined with another modernization of both units. However, the tender was canceled on 14 September 2012 because the lowest bid exceeded the budget of Masovian Railways. A second tender with similar specifications was announced on 8 February 2013, and a contract was signed on 25 April 2013 with a consortium consisting of Pesa and its Mińsk Mazowiecki branch.

During the overhaul, the start-up system was modernized by replacing the existing chopper start-up system with asynchronous motors and power inverters, allowing for an increase in maximum speed from 100 to 120 km/h and improving acceleration from 0.6 m/s² to 1.1 m/s². The electrical system upgrade included relocating the passenger compartment heaters from the roof to the undercarriage in the middle car and installing a microprocessor control system. The car bodies were also updated, including the installation of additional vertical handrails in the passenger compartments for those with larger hand luggage, tilting steps to facilitate boarding from lower platforms, and the removal of four pairs of passenger doors at the ends of the train. The removed doors were replaced with additional seating and two spaces for passengers with reduced mobility. Steps were added to the remaining doors, along with new ramps for disabled passengers. The external doors to the driver’s cabin were modernized, and the interior doors between the cabin and the passenger compartment were removed.

== Operations ==
=== Tricity ===
On 11 February 1993, both EW60 units were accepted into the Gdynia Cisowa locomotive depot, where they underwent trial runs without passengers until November 1993. Passenger service began on 17 November 1993, and continued until December 2000, when the units were taken out of service due to the need for an inspection repair. Instead of repairing the units, the decision was made to cannibalize them, as many parts were compatible with the EW58 series. In late 2005, the Masovian Voivodeship purchased both units for 9.8 million PLN for Masovian Railways, which was struggling with rolling stock shortages.

=== Masovian Railways ===
On 18 December 2005, both units were towed from Gdynia to Warsaw by an ET22 locomotive. In early 2006, Masovian Railways conducted a tender for a major overhaul combined with modernization, which was won by Pesa. The repairs took place between August 2006 and 30 April 2007, with homologation trials conducted in April. A ceremonial presentation was held on 15 May 2007 at the Warszawa Wschodnia railway station.

Due to difficulties in servicing lower platforms, particularly on modernized routes, these units are not suitable for all routes operated by Masovian Railways.

== Bibliography ==
- Kroma, Robert; Sosiński, Janusz; Zintel, Krzysztof (2012). Normalnotorowe wagony silnikowe PKP 1945–1990. Encyklopedia taboru (in Polish) (1 ed.). Poznań: BWH Kolpress. ISBN 978-83-933257-3-3.
