= Train numbering in Poland =

Locomotive numbering system in Poland

PKP classification system (Polish locomotive designation) is a system of assigning letters and numbers to series and individual locomotives used by the PKP - Polish national railroad operator.

The system was introduced for the steam stock by the Ministry of Railways on 3 November 1922, shortly after Poland regained her independence (1918) when the Polish railroads inherited a variety of German, Austrian and Russian steam locomotives, each with its own type convention. It was put into use in 1923–1926 years. The adopted solution allows telling the locomotive type (passenger/freight/mixed), wheel arrangement, origin and some other information from the type designation. After World War II a similar system was also adapted for diesel and electric locomotives.

== Electric and diesel locomotives ==
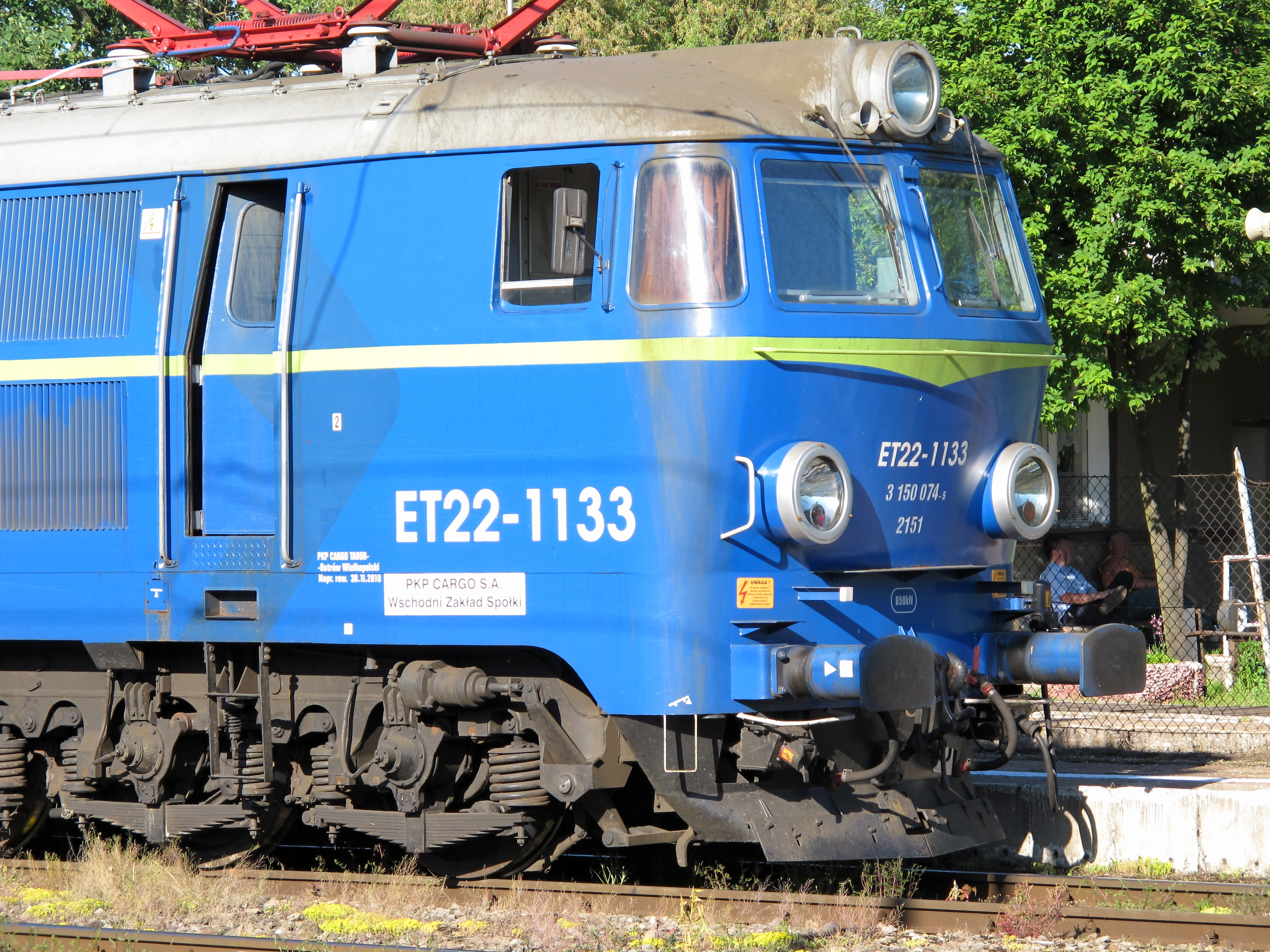
An example of a locomotive designation: E stands for electric locomotive and T stands for freight locomotive. Next two numbers (22) describe six axles, Co-Co, direct current, 3 kV. Next four numbers after dash are an inventory number.

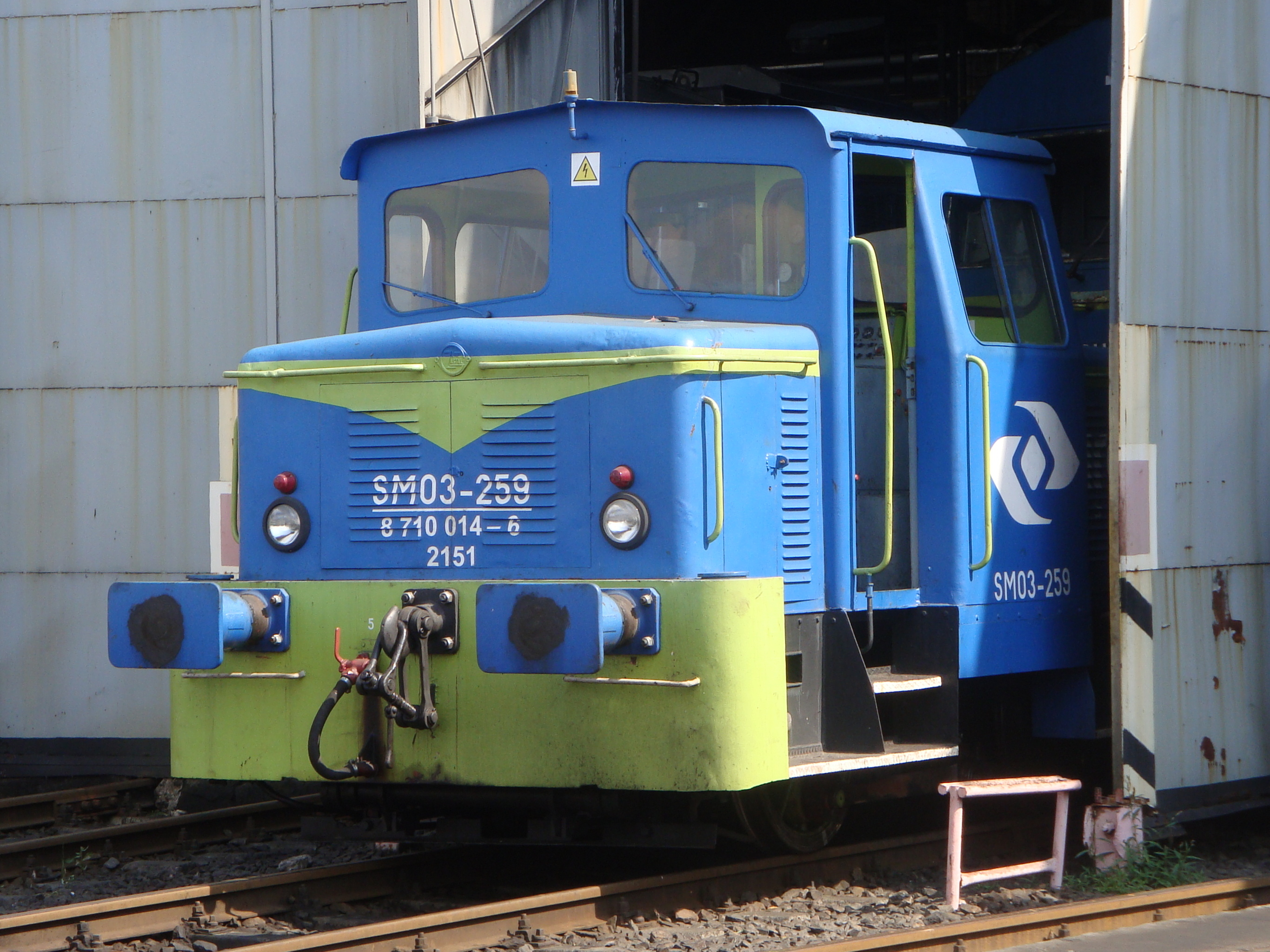
Diesel (S) shunting (M) maneuvering locomotive, no multiple-unit control (01-09 number range)

In the case of electric and diesel locomotives, and multiple units, a designation consists of two capital letters and two digits, without a space between letters and digits. The first letter E or S indicates a kind of traction (electric or diesel), the second letter indicates a locomotive purpose. Digits mark subsequent classes, and their ranges also carry additional information on construction features. Some railcar classes have three digits.

=== First letter ===
- E - electric locomotive (Polish: elektryczna)
- S - diesel locomotive (Polish: spalinowa)

=== Second letter ===
==== Locomotives ====
- P - passenger locomotive (Polish: pasażerska)
- T - freight locomotive (Polish: towarowa)
- U - mixed-traffic locomotive (Polish: uniwersalna - universal)
- M - shunting locomotive (Polish: manewrowa)

==== Electric multiple units ====
- W - for high platforms (Polish: wysokoperonowy)
- N - for both high and low platforms (Polish: niskoperonowy)
- D - for long distance traffic (Polish: dalekobieżny)
- R - for suburban traffic (Polish: podmiejski/regionalny)

==== Diesel railcars and multiple units ====
- D - for long-distance traffic (Polish: dalekobieżny)
- N - for suburban traffic (Polish: podmiejski)
- R - special purpose (mobile workshops, emergency use etc.) (Polish: specjalny)
- A - railbus (Polish: autobus szynowy)

=== Numbers ===
==== Electric locomotives ====
- 01-14 - four axles, Bo-Bo, direct current, 3 kV
- 15-19 - four axles, Bo-Bo, alternating current
- 20-34 - six axles, Co-Co, direct current, 3 kV
- 35-39 - six axles, Co-Co, alternating current
- 40-49 - other types

In the case of electric and diesel locomotives consisting of two cars, the letters A and B were added after the serial number for each car but the number is still the same for both the cars or after important modernisation (look for EU07A, EU07E and EP07P).

==== Electric multiple units ====
- 51–64 – three-car set, 3 kV DC
- 65–69 – three-car set, AC
- 70–74 – four-car set, 3 kV DC
- 75–79 – four-car set, AC
- 80–89 – single electric car, any voltage or type of current
- 90–93 – two car sets, 800 V DC
- 94–99 – other

Every car in a multiple unit is further designated by its own suffix:

- s – (Polish: silnikowy) motor car (with or without a driver's cab)
- d – (Polish: doczepny) trailer car without a driver's cab
- r – (Polish: rozrządczy) trailer car with a driver's cab

If there is more than one car of a given designation in a unit, they are further identified with the letter 'a' or 'b'. For example, a typical 3-car EMU class EN57 consists of the following cars:

- ra (trailer car with a driver's cab)
- s (motor car, in this case without a driver's cab)
- rb (trailer car with a driver's cab)

Another 3-car EMU, class EW58, consists of the following cars:

- sa (motor car, in this case with a driver's cab)
- d (trailer car without a driver's cab)
- sb (motor car, in this case with a driver's cab)

Example of a single car's designation: EN57-830ra.

==== Diesel locomotives ====
- 01–09 – mechanical transmission, no multiple-unit control
- 10–14 – mechanical transmission, multiple-unit control
- 15–24 – hydraulic transmission, no multiple-unit control
- 25–29 – hydraulic transmission, multiple-unit control
- 30–39 – electric transmission, no multiple-unit control
- 40–49 – electric transmission, multiple-unit control

==== Diesel railcars and multiple units ====
- 51–59 – mechanical transmission, no multiple-unit control
- 60–69 – mechanical transmission, multiple-unit control
- 70–79 – hydraulic or hydro-mechanical transmission, no multiple-unit control
- 80–89 – hydraulic transmission, multiple-unit control
- 90–94 – electric transmission, no multiple-unit control
- 95–99 – electric transmission, multiple-unit control

== Steam locomotives ==
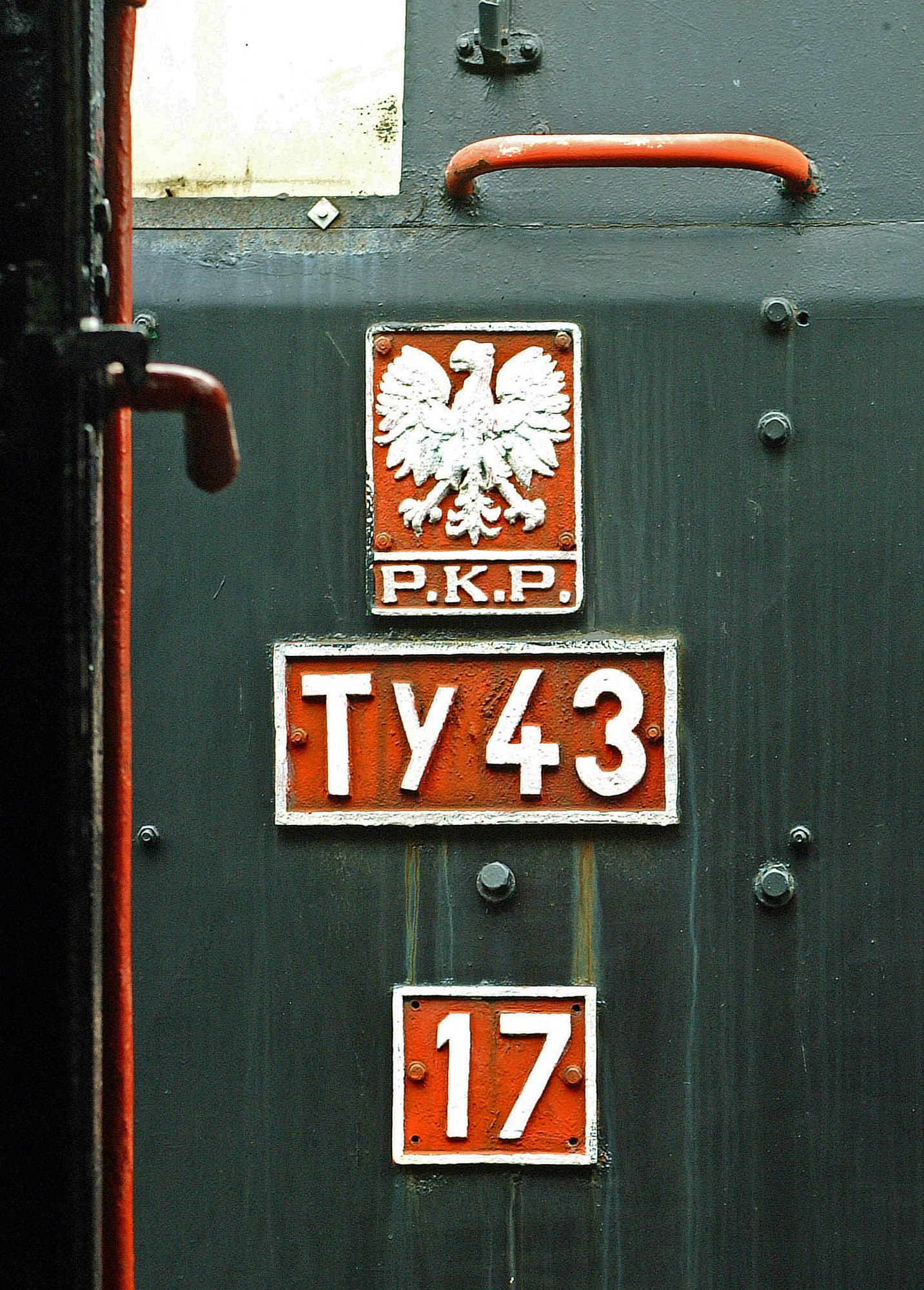
An example of a Ty43 class locomotive designation: T stands for freight locomotive and y stands for 2-10-0 wheel set. 43 describes Polish production, 1943 year of design approval.

Designations of standard gauge PKP steam locomotives consist of two letters (or three letters in case of tank locomotives) and a number written directly behind the letters. Designations of narrow gauge locomotives follow other rules.

=== First letter ===
The upper case letter means:

- P - fast train locomotive (Polish: pospieszna)
- O - mixed/stopping train traffic (Polish: osobowa)
- T - freight locomotive (Polish: towarowa)

=== Last letter ===
Last letter (lower case) indicates the wheel arrangement, in increasing order of the number of driving axles.

- a - one driving axle, any number of unpowered axles
- b - 0-4-0
- c - 2-4-0 or 0-4-2
- d - 4-4-0 or 0-4-4
- e - 2-4-2
- f - 4-4-2 or 2-4-4
- g - two driving axles, more than three unpowered axles,
- h - 0-6-0
- i - 2-6-0 or 0-6-2
- k - 4-6-0 or 0-6-4
- l - 2-6-2
- m - 4-6-2
- n - 2-6-4
- o - three driving axles, more than three unpowered axles
- p - 0-8-0
- r - 2-8-0 or 0-8-2
- s - 4-8-0 or 0-8-4
- t - 2-8-2
- u - four driving axles, more than two unpowered axles
- w - 0-10-0
- y - 2-10-0
- z - five driving axles, more than one unpowered axle

=== Middle letter ===
In the case of tank engines, the letters designating the type of engine and the wheel arrangement are separated by a K (upper case). Thus TKt48 is a 2-8-2T tank locomotive of Polish design introduced in 1948.

=== Number ===
- 1-10 - German or Prussian origin steam engine
- 11-19 - Austrian origin steam engine
- 20-99 - Polish-ordered steam engine, number stood for the last two digits of the year in which the type was approved for production
- 100 - different atypical stock, acquired after 1945, including former private and industry locomotives
- 101-199 - Other foreign steam engine, acquired by PKP between 1918 and 1939 (including German land railways other, than Prussian)
- 201-299 - Other foreign production steam engine, acquired by PKP after 1945

== Serial numbers ==
Following the letters and numbers described above, the serial number of each individual locomotive is stated. This consists of several digits, separated from the type designation characters by a dash.

== Tenders ==
=== First number ===
- First number of tender classification described water capacity in cubic meters made even upwards.

=== Letter ===
- Letter described the number of axles, i.e.:
  - B - two axles
  - C - three axles
  - D - four axles

=== Second number ===
- This referred to the year of construction, so number 23 means the construction was approved in 1923. Numbers 1 to 10 meant Prussian or German origin, 11 to 19 - Austrian origin, above 101 - other foreign origin.

=== An example ===
A tender numbered 22D23 can carry up to 22 m^{3} of water, has four axles, and its construction was approved in 1923.

== See also ==
- PKP
