= Maleniec =

Maleniec may refer to the following places:

- Maleniec, Łódź Voivodeship (central Poland)
- Maleniec, Końskie County in Świętokrzyskie Voivodeship (south-central Poland)
- Maleniec, Włoszczowa County in Świętokrzyskie Voivodeship (south-central Poland)
- Maleniec, Pomeranian Voivodeship (north Poland)
