= Żychlin (disambiguation) =

Żychlin is a town in Łódź Voivodeship (central Poland).

Żychlin may also refer to the following places:

- Żychlin, Piotrków County in Łódź Voivodeship
- Żychlin, Greater Poland Voivodeship (west-central Poland)
- Żychlin, Pleszew County in Greater Poland Voivodeship
- Żychlin, Pomeranian Voivodeship (north Poland)
