= Kafar =

Kafar may refer to:

- Kafar, Iran, a village in North Khorasan Province
- Kafar, Łódź Voivodeship, Poland
