= Gutow =

Gutow may refer to:

- Gutow, Rostock, a municipality in Mecklenburg-Vorpommern, Germany
- Steve Gutow, a rabbi, lawyer, community activist, and Jewish leader

== See also ==
- Gutów (disambiguation)
- Gutowo (disambiguation)
