= Dziwle =

- Village
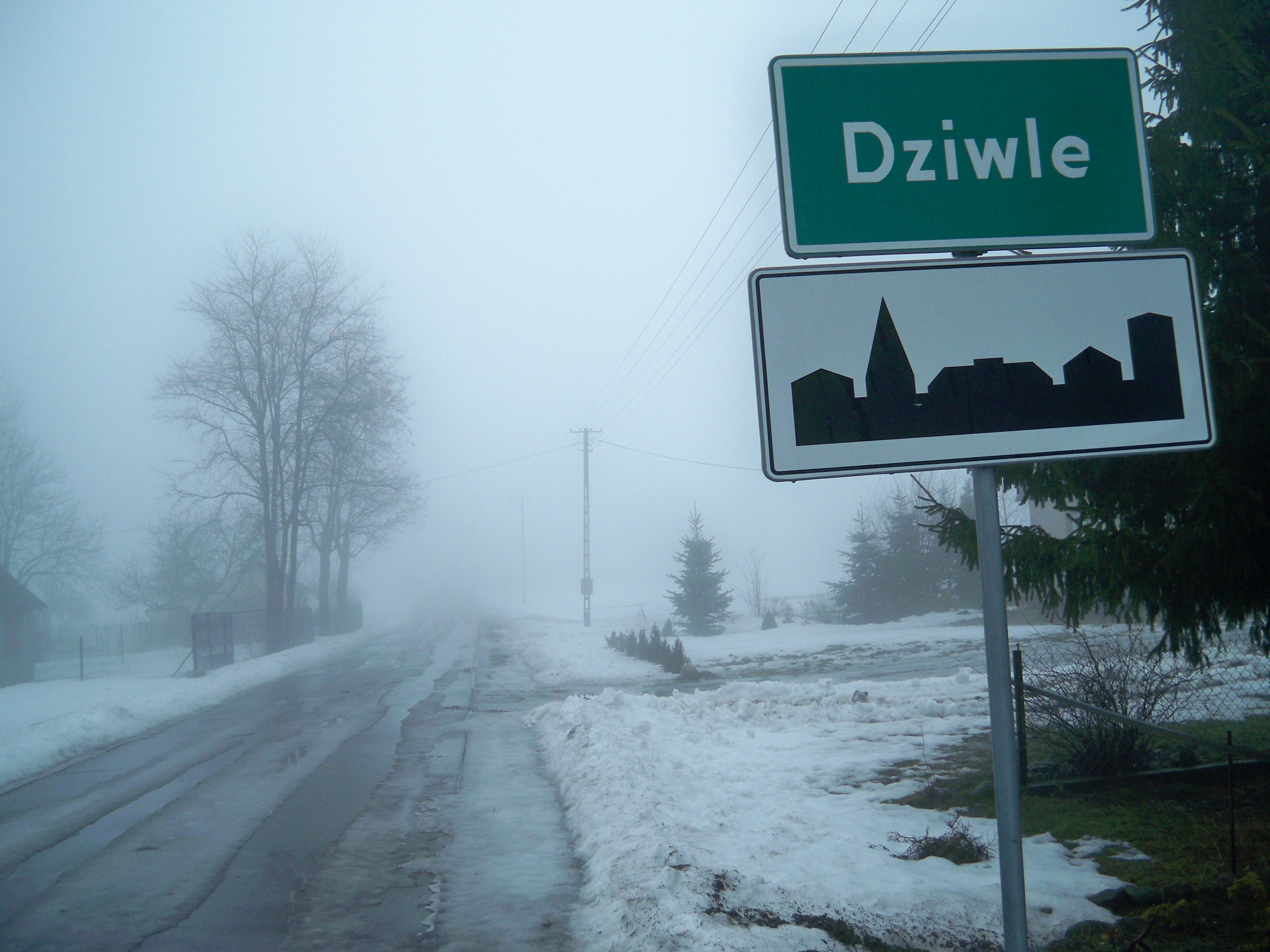

- Location within Poland
- Coordinates: 51°31′N 19°32′E
- Country: Poland
- Voivodeship: Łódź
- County: Piotrków
- Gmina: Grabica

Dziwle [ˈd͡ʑivlɛ] is a village in the administrative district of Gmina Grabica, within Piotrków County, Łódź Voivodeship, in central Poland.
