= Majków-Folwark =

- Village
- Location within Poland
- Coordinates: 51°25′47″N 19°37′20″E
- Country: Poland
- Voivodeship: Łódź
- County: Piotrków
- Gmina: Grabica
- Population (approx.): 150

Majków-Folwark (Polish pronunciation: [ˈmajkuf ˈfɔlvark]) is a village in the administrative district of Gmina Grabica, within Piotrków County, Łódź Voivodeship, in central Poland.

The village has an approximate population of 150.
