= Kociołki, Piotrków County =

Kociołki
- Village
- Location within Poland
- Coordinates: 51°31′N 19°27′E
- Country: Poland
- Voivodeship: Łódź
- County: Piotrków
- Gmina: Grabica

Kociołki [kɔˈt͡ɕɔu̯ki] is a village in the administrative district of Gmina Grabica, within Piotrków County, Łódź Voivodeship, in central Poland.
