= Olendry, Łódź Voivodeship =

Olendry
- Village
- Location within Poland
- Coordinates: 51°26′44″N 19°37′06″E
- Country: Poland
- Voivodeship: Łódź
- County: Piotrków
- Gmina: Grabica

Olendry [ɔˈlɛndrɨ] is a village in the administrative district of Gmina Grabica, within Piotrków County, Łódź Voivodeship, in central Poland.
