= PKP class EW58 =

Electric multiple unit produced by Pafawag

EW58
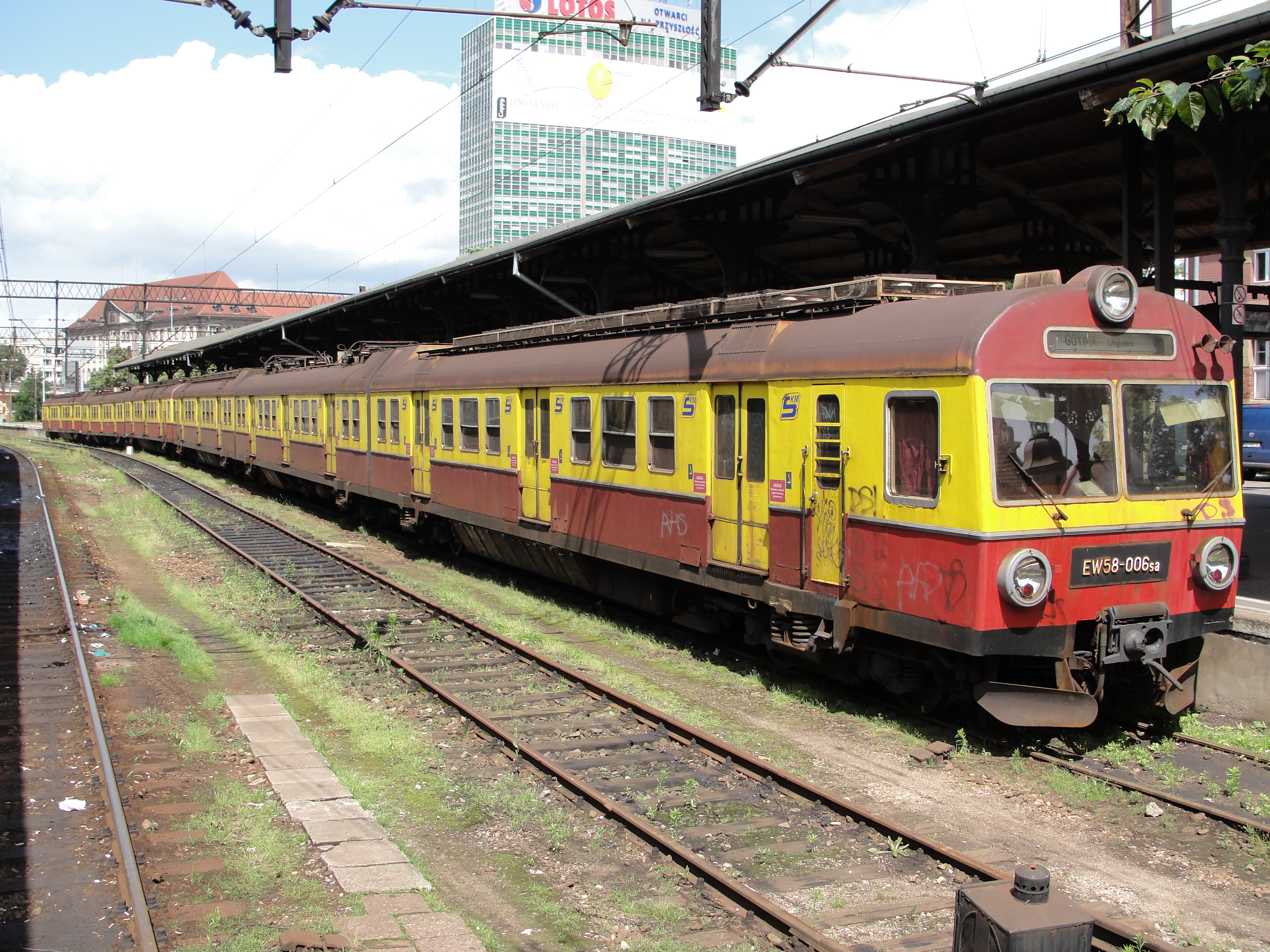
- Stock type: electric multiple unit
- Manufacturer: Pafawag
- Assembly: Wrocław, Poland
- Constructed: 1974–1980
- Number built: 28
- Capacity: 564

Specifications
- Train length: 64,000 mm (2,500 in)
- Width: 2,880 mm (113 in)
- Height: 3,900 mm (150 in)
- Platform height: 1,180 mm (46 in)
- Wheel diameter: drive wheels: 1,000 mm (39 in); rolling wheels: 920 mm (36 in)
- Maximum speed: 100 km/h (62 mph)
- Weight: 147 t (324,000 lb)
- Engine type: LKa-435
- Power output: 8×205 kW
- Acceleration: 0.9 m/s²
- Braking system(s): Oerlikon

Pafawag 3WE and 3WEa (car type 301B+401B+301B, series EW58) are standard gauge three-car high-platform electric multiple units produced by Pafawag in Wrocław between 1974 and 1980, with a total of 28 units built.

Initially, these vehicles were intended for the Gdańsk and Warsaw railway hubs, but they were ultimately only operated in the Tricity. In the 1990s, most of the units were involved in accidents and subsequently scrapped. In 2010, there were plans to modernize the remaining 7 units in operation, but two years later, this refurbishment was canceled, and their service was terminated. By the end of 2016, it was decided to scrap 6 units and preserve the seventh as an exhibit.

The experience gained from the production and operation of 3WE units was used to build two units of the 6WE series in 1990.

== Origins ==
In the mid-1960s, the electric multiple units (EMUs) in operation in Poland, which had been designed based on pre-World War II concepts, were becoming increasingly outdated compared to foreign vehicles. As a result, in 1964, the Railway Scientific and Technical Centre began developing the specifications for new units. Initially, two simultaneous projects were undertaken: low-platform units type 2WE and high-platform units type 3WE, which were intended for the Warsaw and Gdańsk railway hubs. However, due to the ongoing serial production of the low-platform EN57 units, the 2WE project was postponed, and it was decided to prioritize the development of the 3WE units.

== Production ==
=== Prototypes ===
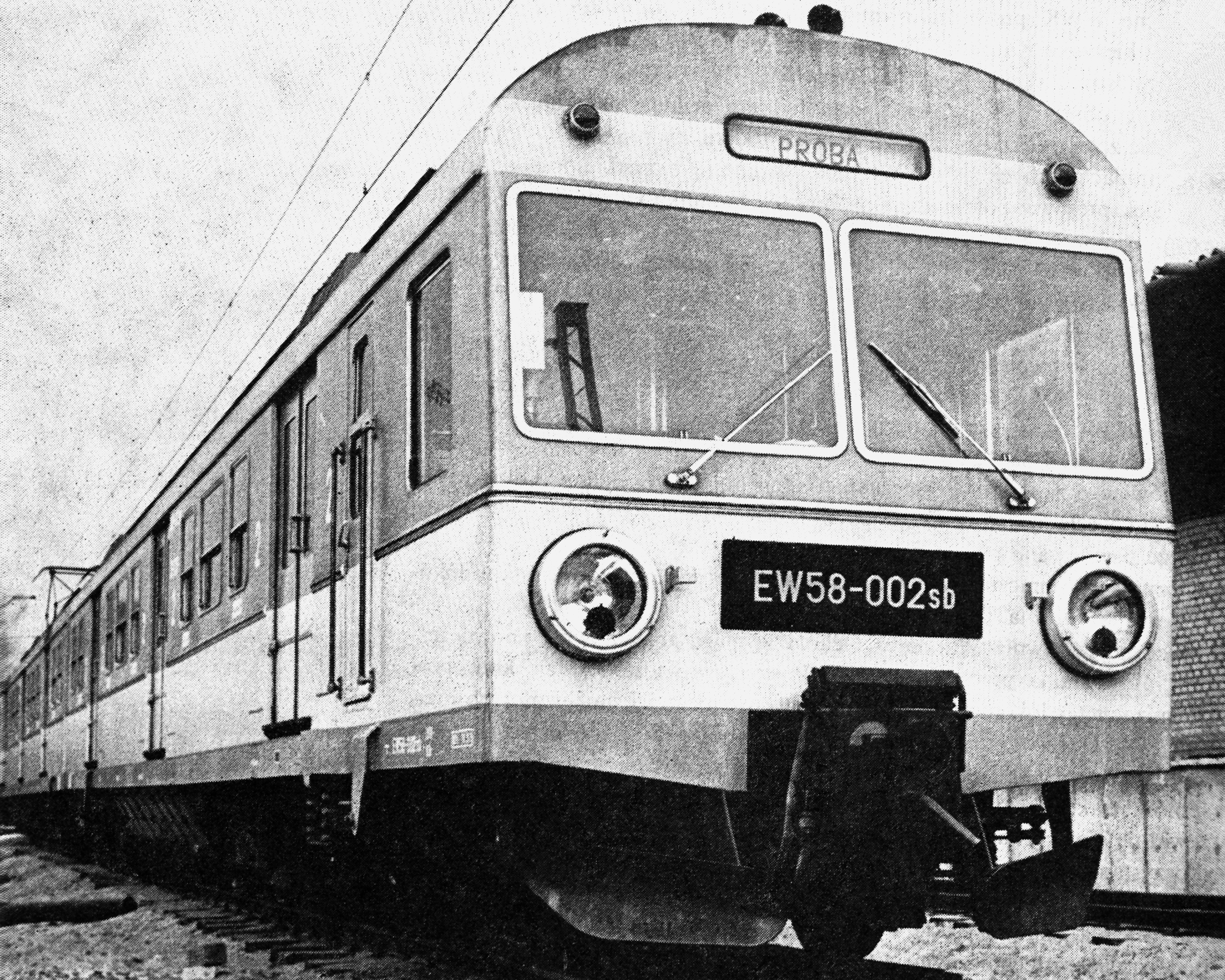
EW58-002 during a test drive in Warsaw

The design for the 3WE units was completed in 1967 by Zbigniew Tyszka from the Railway Scientific and Technical Centre. In 1973, the Central Design Bureau for Railway Rolling Stock developed the construction documentation for these vehicles. The electrical components were initially led by Stefan Wróblewski, followed by Alojzy Kiełkiewicz, who collaborated with Eugeniusz Małecki, Zbigniew Durzyński, and Aleksander Płatkiewicz. Romuald Łużny, along with engineers Perk and Ludek, was responsible for the mechanical parts. The unit was designed for the operational conditions of the Warsaw railway hub, which involved a high frequency of trains on the Warsaw Cross-City Line, short distances between stops, and the need to achieve high speeds on suburban routes. To meet these requirements, the power and gear ratio (77:20) of the unit were adjusted, and a new motor with dynamic braking capability was designed. The dynamic brake was controlled by a thyristor-based motor excitation regulation system.

The first prototype was completed at the Pafawag plant in Wrocław in June 1974 and was showcased at the Poznań International Fair. In 1975, two additional units were delivered. These prototypes were tested at the Railway Scientific and Technical Centre under the supervision of Bogdan Paszkowski and were then assigned to the Tricity's Szybka Kolej Miejska to replace outdated rolling stock after the traction voltage was increased from 800 to 3,000 V DC.

=== Series production ===
In 1977, a pre-production series of five units was built, which, unlike the first three prototypes, featured an upper headlight. After receiving feedback from the trial operations, design modifications were made. Starting in 1978, the units were produced in a modified version known as 3WEa, which featured a compartmentless interior styled similarly to metro trains. In 1978, seven units were built, numbered from 009 to 015. In 1979, five more units were produced, numbered 016 to 020, with unit EW58-018 being presented at the Poznań International Fair. In 1980, the final eight units, numbered 021 to 028, were delivered.

In 1984, for testing purposes related to the development of the EW60 units, thyristor pulse start was installed in the EW58-018sa car, while the old resistance start was retained in the second motor car. The tests concluded in 1988, determining that the system was not suitable for mass implementation, and it was not adopted for the EW60 units. The test unit remained at the Railway Scientific and Technical Centre until 1992.

=== Conclusion ===
Initially, it was planned that the German-built 800 V rolling stock would be temporarily replaced by EN57 units and that by 1980, the entire Tricity Szybka Kolej Miejska fleet would be replaced by EW58 units. However, between 1974 and 1980, only 28 units of the series were produced, far short of the nearly 100 planned. Their operation in the Tricity railway hub revealed the unreliability of these units and their low operational efficiency. The design was criticized for numerous flaws, including the poor quality of some prototype machines and electrical components. Additionally, the inadequate repair and maintenance infrastructure of Polish State Railways, combined with the insufficient power supply network and the higher energy consumption of the EW58 units compared to the EN57 series, led to the abandonment of further production. A decision was made to design a new vehicle, which eventually resulted in the creation of two EW60-type EMUs in 1990, based on the EW58 units.

== Construction ==
=== Car body ===
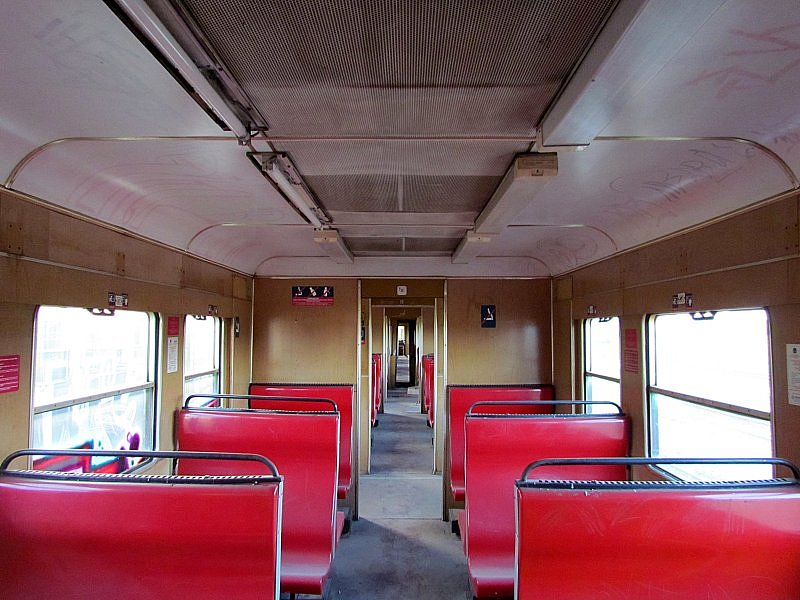
Interior with full partition walls of 3WE units

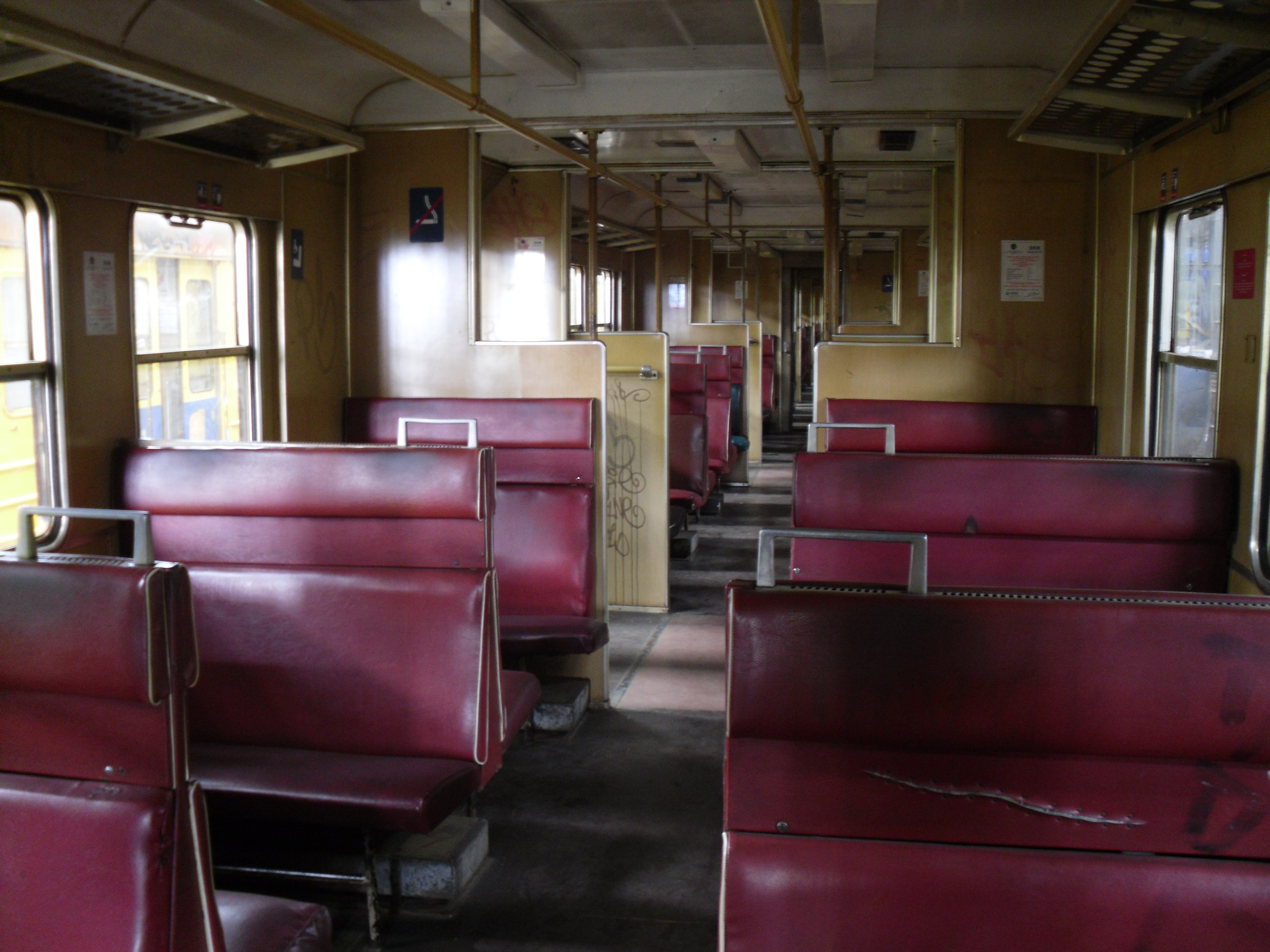
Interior with low partition walls of 3WEa units

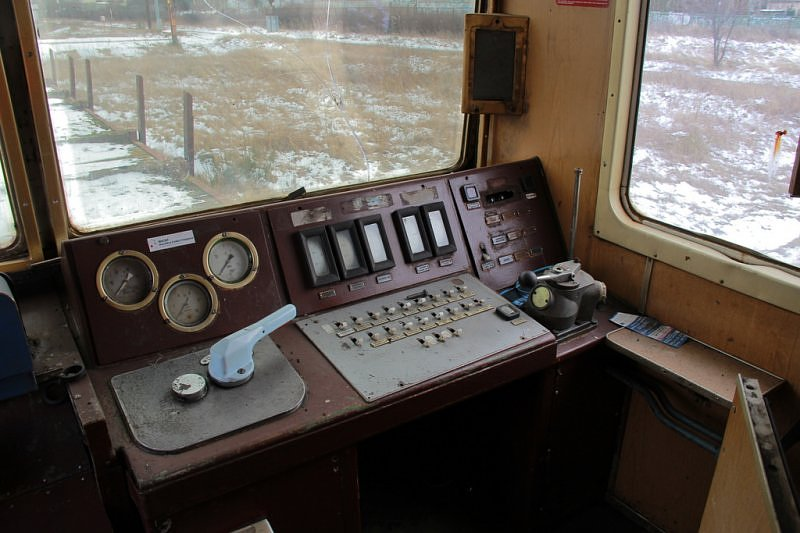
Driver's cabin

The 3WE unit was composed of three cars – two motor cars and one trailer car. The end cars of type 301B were cab cars and were designated by the Polish State Railways as sa and sb (motor cars a and b), while the trailer car of type 401B was located in the middle of the trainset and was designated as d. This was the first Polish unit with a motor car+trailer+motor car configuration.

The cars were connected by a short coupling (without a head, non-detachable under operational conditions) and a passenger walkway protected and sealed by rubber rollers. On the ends of the cab cars (the beginning and end of the trainset), long couplers (automatic Scharfenberg couplers) were used, allowing the units to be connected into trainsets. EW58 units numbered from 004 onward were equipped for multiple-unit operation with up to three vehicles from the same series as well as with the EN57 series, although this was only possible with the lower starting setting that matched the parameters of the EN57 vehicles. The three prototype units could not operate in conjunction with other vehicles.

The body of each car consisted of a frame made of rolled and stamped profiles and sheet metal cladding. The construction was self-supporting, entirely steel, and welded, meeting all the strength requirements specified in UIC VE567 and the relevant Organisation for Co‑operation between Railways regulations. The inner side of the car body sheets was coated with a 1.5 mm thick layer of asbestos-bitumen damping material for corrosion protection, over which a layer of thermal insulation was applied. The walls and ceilings were lined with Unilam panels. The floors were insulated with a layer of felt, over which a 3 mm thick covering was laid. The floor in the toilet was covered with ceramic tiles on a cement base.

=== Interior and passenger space ===
The unit had entrances designed for boarding from high station platforms. Each car had three pairs of sliding passenger entry doors on each side of the vehicle. Passages between the cars were equipped with sliding doors. Initially, the entrances from the vestibules to the compartments were also closed with single-leaf sliding doors, and the units equipped with these were designated as 3WE. Over time, however, the doors were removed, and the partition walls were modified into windbreaks lowered to the upper edges of the seats, thus creating the 3WEa units.

All internal and external doors were made of glued aluminum sheets, while the glass in all windows was made of tempered glass. Shelves, rails, fittings, and handles in the interior were made of aluminum alloys. The fluorescent interior lighting, powered by a 220 V voltage from a separate voltage converter, provided an intensity of 150 lx at a height of 80 cm above the floor level. Convection-air heating was used, with adjustable power radiators placed under the benches in the compartments and on the walls in the vestibules.

=== Underframe ===
Each of the end cars was supported on two powered bogies of type 3MNa with a wheelbase of 2,500 mm and a wheel diameter of 1,000 mm. The middle car was supported on two trailer bogies of type 9ANa with a wheelbase of 2,500 mm and a wheel diameter of 920 mm. All bogies were equipped with forkless axle guidance using jointed rods and coil springs in the first suspension stage, along with a set of springs and rubber elements mounted directly in the bogie frame sockets in the second suspension stage.

The wheelbase of the end cars in each car was 17,540 mm.

=== Power supply and drive ===
Direct current at 3,000 V, transmitted via overhead lines, was collected by two current collectors mounted on the roof of the middle car. It powered the traction motors located in the end cars, with the motors in each of these cars permanently connected in series. The use of 8 traction motors significantly improved the vehicle's acceleration, which was particularly important in urban areas with short distances between stops, but at the same time, it greatly increased the energy consumption of the unit. This was a key factor in halting the purchase of additional vehicles of this series.

The unit was designed with the intention of using domestically produced impulse start, but this was never implemented, so the manufacturer had to use the traditional resistor start. The EW58 was equipped with electro-pneumatic and pneumatic brakes of the Oerlikon system, as well as a dynamic resistor brake, which could be used at speeds above 100 km/h.

== Operation ==
Country	Operator	Number of units	Designation	Years of operation
Poland	Polish State Railways (until 1998) Polish State Railways in Gdańsk (1998–1999) Polish State Railways in Tricity (1999–2001) Szybka Kolej Miejska (from 2001)	0 (28)	EW58-001 ÷ 028	1974–2012

=== Early years ===
The EW58 series was initially intended for operation in the Warsaw railway hub, but ultimately all vehicles of this series were transferred to the Szybka Kolej Miejska in Tricity. They were initially stationed at the Chylonia locomotive depot and maintained at a maintenance and repair facility that was not equipped to service three-car units.

The first three EW58 units, produced and delivered to Tricity between 1974 and 1975, were tested on the route from Gdynia to Wejherowo and in Gdańsk on the line to Nowy Port, where the voltage had been changed from 800 to 3,000 V DC on 1 October 1973. As additional units of this series were delivered, they were directed to the Gdańsk–Wejherowo line, which, due to increasing passenger traffic, required trains composed of three sets. On the less busy route to Nowy Port, single units were sufficient, so the three prototypes not adapted for multiple-unit operation were sent to this line.

The limited number of EW58 sets compared to the rest of the rolling stock serving the Szybka Kolej Miejska system did not allow for full utilization of their technical capabilities. They alternated with the EN57 units, which had inferior performance, making it impossible to shorten the scheduled travel time.

The EW58 EMUs leaving the assembly halls were painted orange with a horizontal cream stripe running along the entire body. During subsequent inspections and repairs, the cream color sometimes changed, occasionally becoming yellow.

On 1 August 1982, at the Chylonia locomotive depot, EW58-023, inadequately secured after repairs, was accidentally started and collided at a speed of 70 km/h with unit EW58-027, which then ran into EN57-1130+1108. As a result of the incident, the frames of both EW58 units were cracked, leading to the decision to scrap them. Between 1986 and 1987, the three prototype units of the EW58 series were converted into network trains.

=== Turn of the 20th and 21st century ===
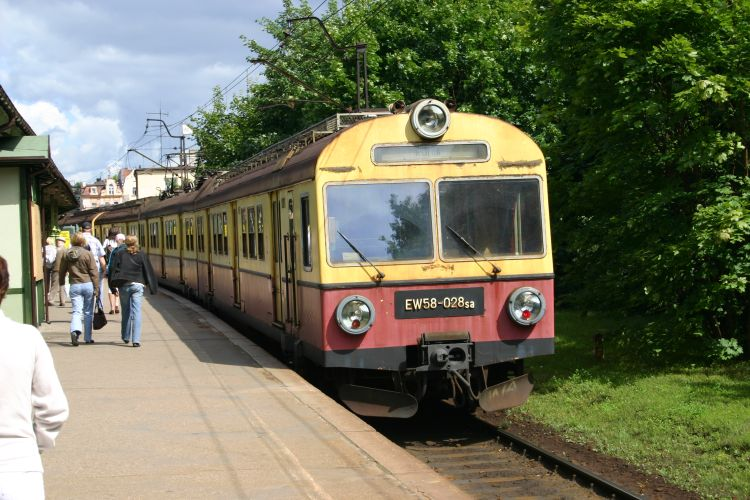
EW58-028 in livery styled after Berlin S-Bahn

In December 1988, the rolling stock serving the Szybka Kolej Miejska, including 23 EW58 units, was transferred to the newly opened Gdynia Cisowa electric locomotive depot. This facility was specifically designed and built for the storage and repair of the Tricity three-car train units.

Between 1989 and 1999, 15 units were destroyed, mostly due to fires. As of 1 December 1999, the newly established Polish State Railways' Szybka Kolej Miejska in Tricity had 8 EW58 units numbered 005, 006, 011, 012, 016, 019, 024, and 028.

In 2000, a new livery was introduced, inspired by the color scheme used by Berlin S-Bahn. On 6 May 2000, units EW58-024 and 005 were the first to receive the new yellow-red-black colors.

In 2001, two sections of the EW58-016 unit were destroyed by fire at the Rumia railway station. As of 1 July 2001, Szybka Kolej Miejska in Tricity was operating 7 units of this series.

In August 2009, the operator returned to the original orange livery of the vehicles. On 26 September 2009, a special ride was held with the newly refurbished and orange-painted units EW58-028 and 011.

=== Unfulfilled modernization and withdrawal from service ===
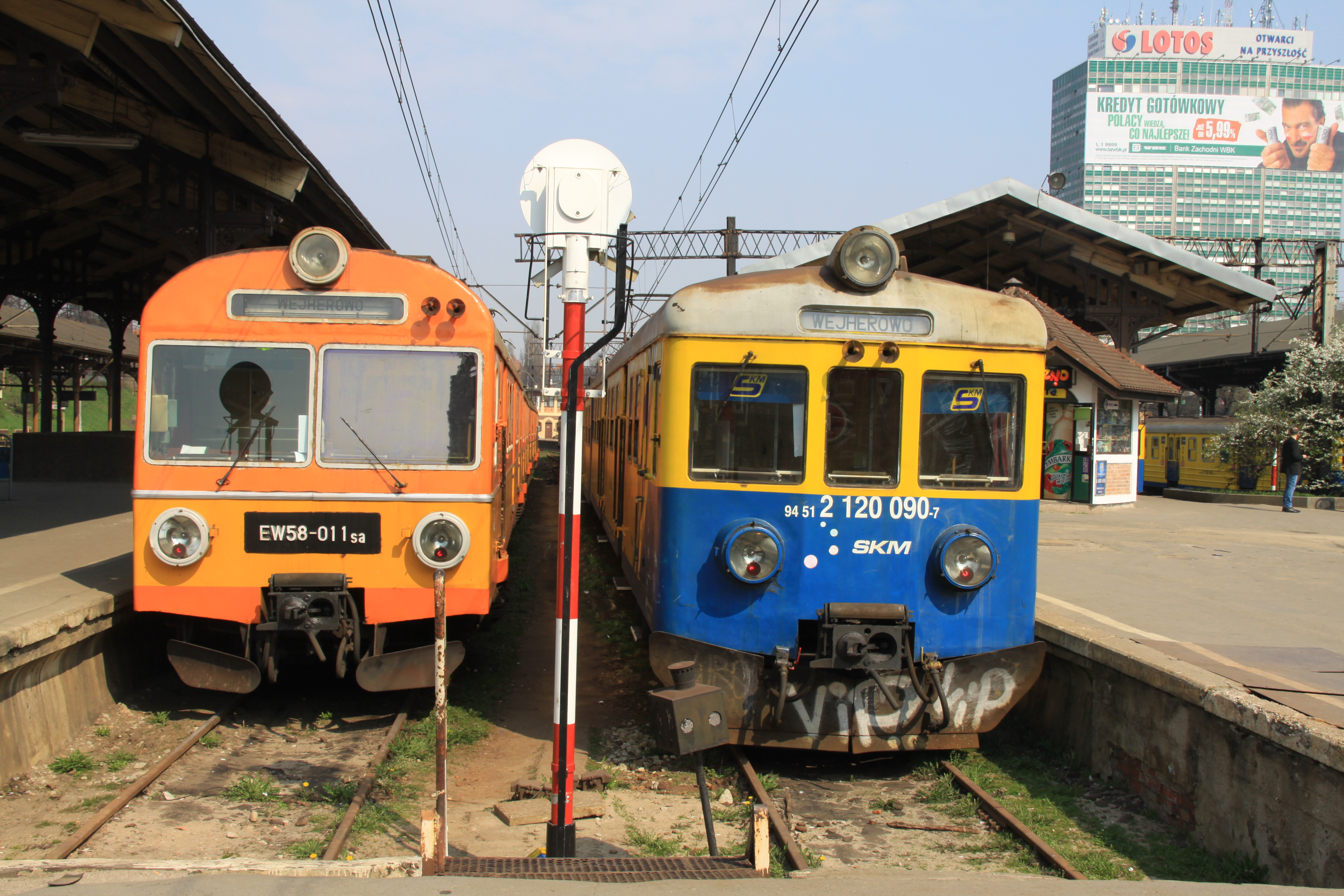
EW58-011 and EN57-1670 at Gdańsk Główny railway station

On 19 November 2010, Tricity Szybka Kolej Miejska announced an open tender for the modernization of 21 EMUs – 15 EN57 units, 2 EN71 units, and 4 EW58 units. The plan was to create 3 four-car units with the configuration s+d+d+s from EW58 units 011, 012, 019, and 028 and the middle cars from units 005, 006, and 024. Additionally, 1 three-car unit with the existing s+d+s configuration was planned. The three-car unit was to be designated EW58ASKM, while the new four-car units were to be designated EW77ASKM. The modernized units were to be equipped with streamlined fronts, making them resemble the newest vehicles of the Tricity operator, along with asynchronous motors, impulse start-up systems, lifts, closed-system toilets, spaces for wheelchair users, bicycle racks, internal monitoring, and passenger information systems. Two companies, Bydgoszcz-based Pesa and Nowy Sącz-based Newag, submitted bids for the tender. On 22 March 2011, Newag's bid was selected, with the modernization of all 21 units costing just under 140 million PLN.

In 2011, due to the planned modernization of the EW58 series, all 7 operational units were withdrawn from service. The EW58-024 unit and the middle car from EW58-006, intended to form the first rebuilt four-car unit, were transported to Nowy Sącz. The remaining 5 units were temporarily reinstated to service to handle football matches and transport Arka Gdynia fans from Redłowo. These were mostly hooligans who vandalized the trains, so the interiors were not refurbished.

In 2012, the modernization project was ultimately canceled due to the high costs involved. On September 20, the four-car unit awaiting modernization was towed by a EU07 locomotive from Nowy Sącz to Gdańsk Główny. Around the same time, the remaining units serving Arka Gdynia matches were permanently withdrawn from service.

The EW58 EMUs earned two nicknames during their time in service. Initially, Tricity railway workers called them UFO because they were unreliable, with unpredictable malfunctions and uncertain behavior on the tracks. Later, they were also referred to as colors, as no two units were identical due to the changes introduced during serial production.

=== Fate of the vehicles after service ===
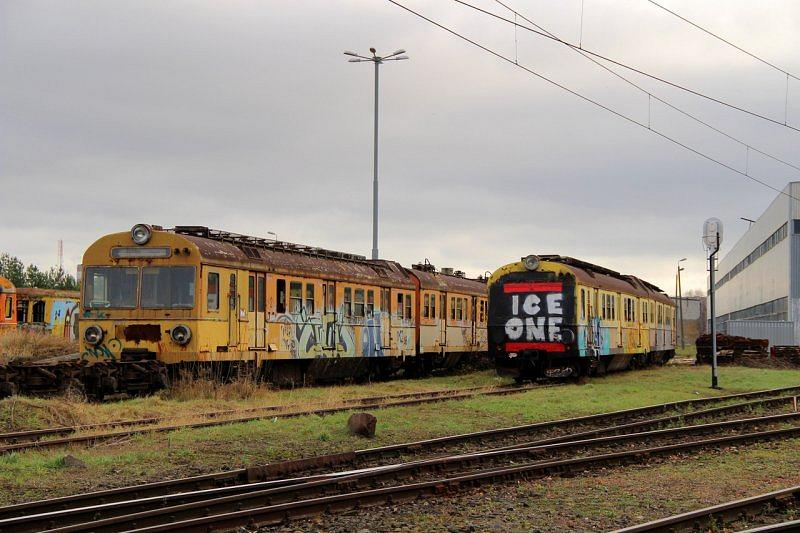
Decommissioned EW58 units awaiting scrapping

The EW58 units that were taken out of service in 2012 were gradually placed in long-term storage. In the spring of 2015, after re-evaluating the feasibility of conducting P5 overhauls and modernizations, the operator decided to officially decommission 6 out of the 7 EW58 units. At the beginning of September, units EW58-005, 006, 011, 012, 019, and 024 were put up for sale. According to Szybka Kolej Miejska, it was possible to continue operating these units after a P4 overhaul.

Due to the lack of interest in the previous sale, in early November 2016, Szybka Kolej Miejska reissued a tender to sell the 6 units, this time as scrap metal. During this time, the company also decided that the 7th remaining unit, EW58-028, would be preserved as a historical vehicle, likely to become a permanent exhibit. However, on November 12, the EW58-011 unit, slated for scrapping, was destroyed by fire, likely due to arson. By the end of that month, the scrapping of the other units began, and it was completed by December 15.

In mid-May 2017, it was announced that there were plans to restore the remaining vehicle to its original condition. Additionally, two cabs from the scrapped units were preserved. On July 11, the complete cab of the EW58-019sa car was integrated into the wall of the service hall at the Gdynia Cisowa locomotive depot, becoming a technical monument.

== Bibliography ==
- Kroma, Robert; Sosiński, Janusz; Zintel, Krzysztof (2012). Normalnotorowe wagony silnikowe PKP 1945–1990. Encyklopedia taboru (in Polish) (1 ed.). Poznań: BWH Kolpress. ISBN 978-83-933257-3-3.
- Buczek, Bartłomiej, ed. (2011). Z dziejów Szybkiej Kolei Miejskiej w Trójmieście (in Polish). Gdynia: PKP Szybka Kolej Miejska w Trójmieście.
- Buczek, Bartłomiej, ed. (2016). Dzieje Szybkiej Kolei Miejskiej w Trójmieście (in Polish). Bydgoszcz: Polska Izba Producentów Urządzeń i Usług na Rzecz Kolei.
- Elektryfikacja PKP na przełomie wieków XX i XXI: w siedemdziesiątą rocznicę elektryfikacji PKP (in Polish). Warsaw: Z.P. Poligrafia. 2006. ISBN 978-83-922944-6-7.
