= Wola Kamocka =

- Village
- Location within Poland
- Coordinates: 51°30′N 19°34′E
- Country: Poland
- Voivodeship: Łódź
- County: Piotrków
- Gmina: Grabica

Wola Kamocka [ˈvɔla kaˈmɔt͡ska] is a village in the administrative district of Gmina Grabica, within Piotrków County, Łódź Voivodeship, in central Poland.
