= Gutowo =

Gutowo may refer to:

- Gutowo, a sub-camp of Stutthof concentration camp
- Gutowo, Brodnica County in Kuyavian-Pomeranian Voivodeship (north-central Poland)
- Gutowo, Toruń County in Kuyavian-Pomeranian Voivodeship (north-central Poland)
- Gutowo, Warmian-Masurian Voivodeship (north Poland)

== See also ==
- Gutow (disambiguation)
- Gutów (disambiguation)
