= Kamocinek =

- Village
- Location within Poland
- Coordinates: 51°27′11″N 19°32′52″E
- Country: Poland
- Voivodeship: Łódź
- County: Piotrków
- Gmina: Grabica
- Population: 90

Kamocinek [kamɔˈt͡ɕinɛk] is a village in the administrative district of Gmina Grabica, within Piotrków County, Łódź Voivodeship, in central Poland.
