= Krzepczów =

- Village
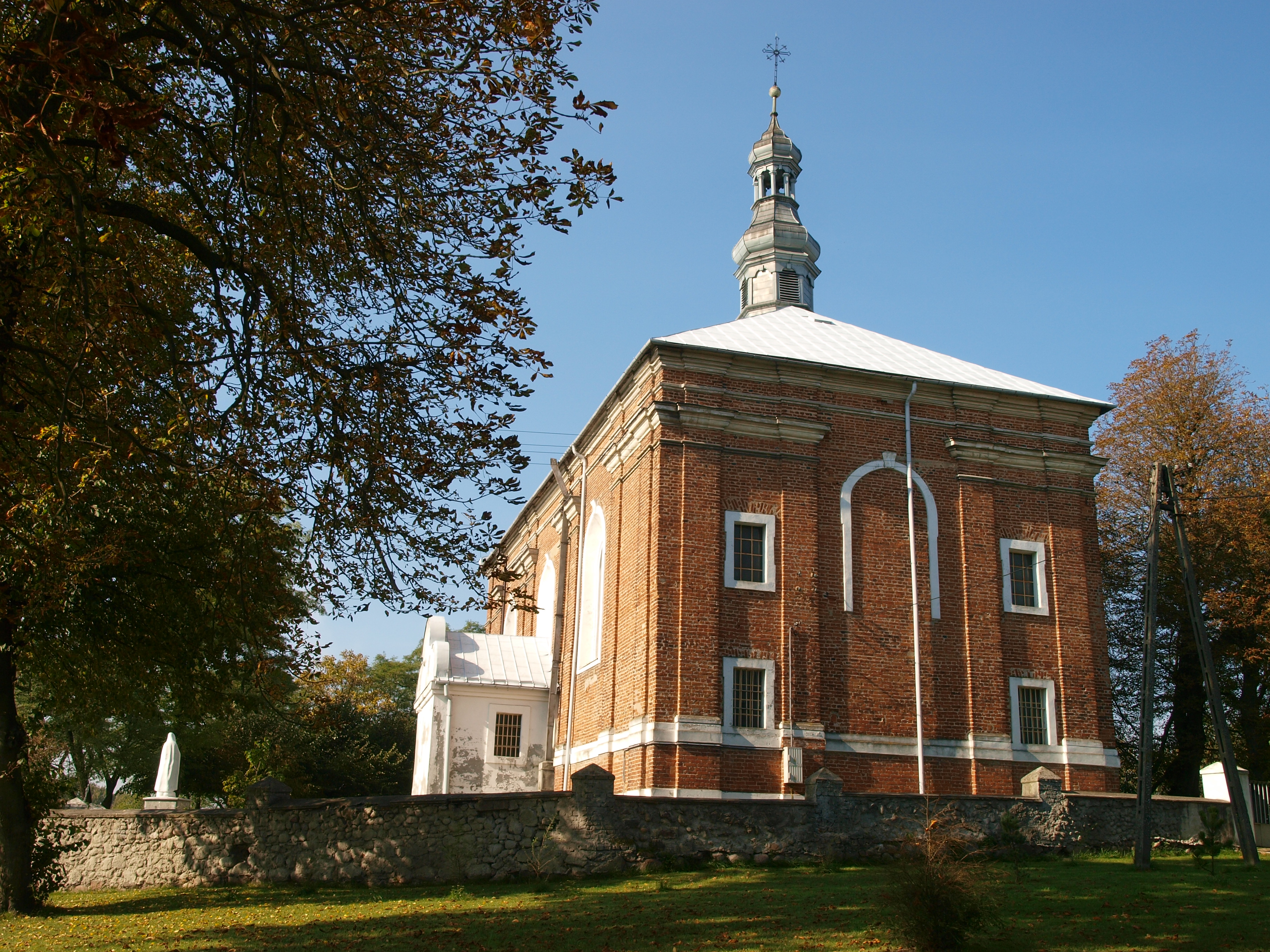
- Catholic church

- Location within Poland
- Coordinates: 51°27′18″N 19°30′10″E
- Country: Poland
- Voivodeship: Łódź
- County: Piotrków
- Gmina: Grabica
- Population: 380

Krzepczów [ˈkʂɛpt͡ʂuf] is a village in the administrative district of Gmina Grabica, within Piotrków County, Łódź Voivodeship, in central Poland.
