= Żeronie =

- Village
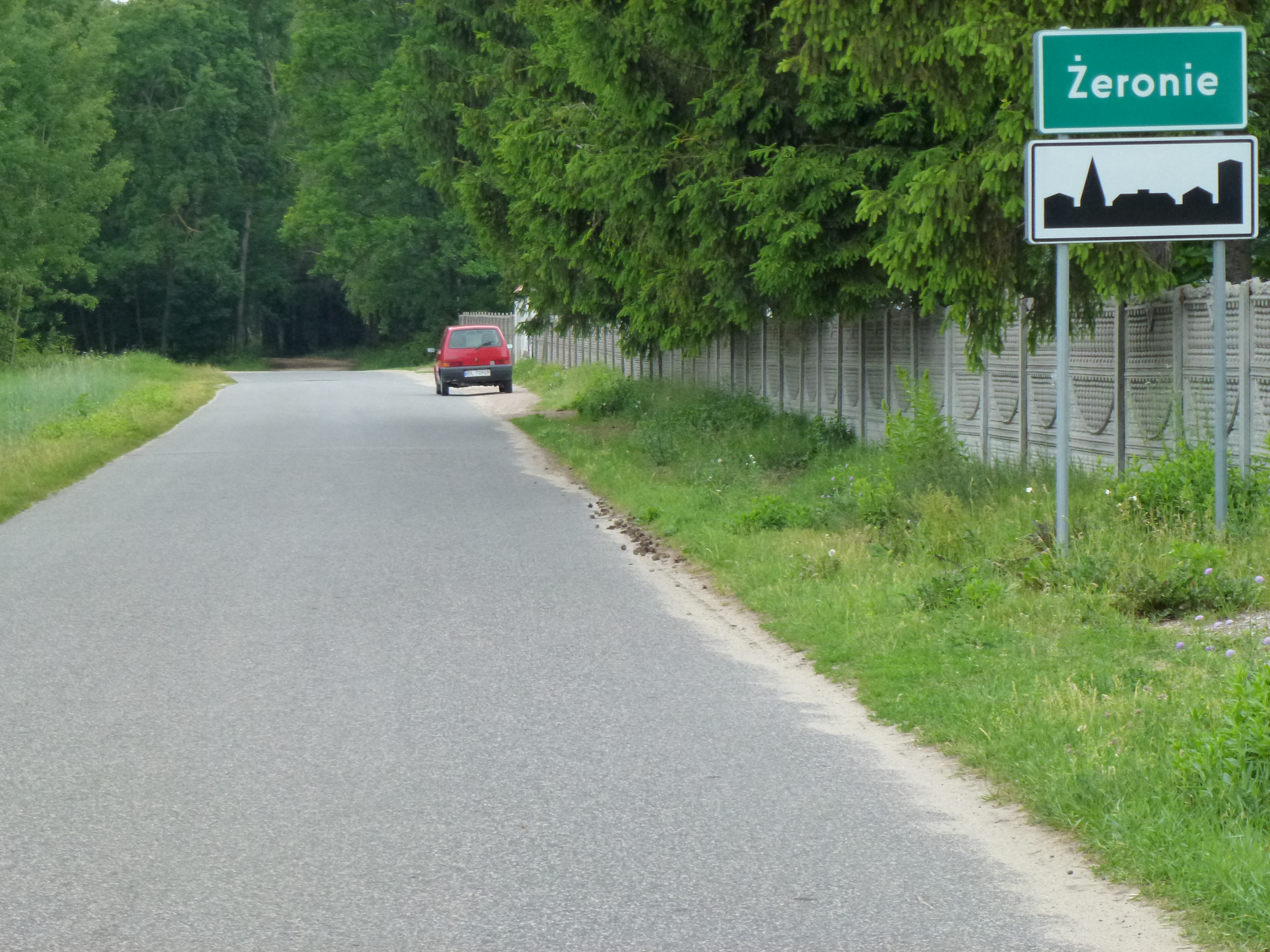

- Location within Poland
- Coordinates: 51°32′N 19°29′E
- Country: Poland
- Voivodeship: Łódź
- County: Piotrków
- Gmina: Grabica

Żeronie [ʐɛˈrɔɲɛ] is a village in the administrative district of Gmina Grabica, within Piotrków County, Łódź Voivodeship, in central Poland.
