= Zaborów, Piotrków County =

Zaborów
- Village
- Location within Poland
- Coordinates: 51°26′26″N 19°32′7″E
- Country: Poland
- Voivodeship: Łódź
- County: Piotrków
- Gmina: Grabica

Zaborów [zaˈbɔruf] is a village in the administrative district of Gmina Grabica, within Piotrków County, Łódź Voivodeship, in central Poland.
