= Twardosławice =

- Village
- Location within Poland
- Coordinates: 51°25′N 19°38′E
- Country: Poland
- Voivodeship: Łódź
- County: Piotrków
- Gmina: Grabica

Twardosławice [tfardɔswaˈvit͡sɛ] is a village in the administrative district of Gmina Grabica, within Piotrków County, Łódź Voivodeship, in central Poland.
