= Wola Bykowska =

- Village
- Location within Poland
- Coordinates: 51°27′27″N 19°39′02″E
- Country: Poland
- Voivodeship: Łódź
- County: Piotrków
- Gmina: Grabica

Wola Bykowska [ˈvɔla bɨˈkɔfska] is a village in the administrative district of Gmina Grabica, within Piotrków County, Łódź Voivodeship, in central Poland.
