= Władysławów, Piotrków County =

Władysławów
- Village
- Location within Poland
- Coordinates: 51°27′N 19°39′E
- Country: Poland
- Voivodeship: Łódź
- County: Piotrków
- Gmina: Grabica

Władysławów [vwadɨˈswavuf] is a village in the administrative district of Gmina Grabica, within Piotrków County, Łódź Voivodeship, in central Poland.
