= Żądło, Łódź Voivodeship =

Żądło
- Village
- Location within Poland
- Coordinates: 51°25′54.11″N 19°31′06.83″E
- Country: Poland
- Voivodeship: Łódź
- County: Piotrków
- Gmina: Grabica

Żądło [ˈʐɔndwɔ] is a village in the administrative district of Gmina Grabica, within Piotrków County, Łódź Voivodeship, in central Poland.
