= Majdany, Piotrków County =

Majdany
- Village
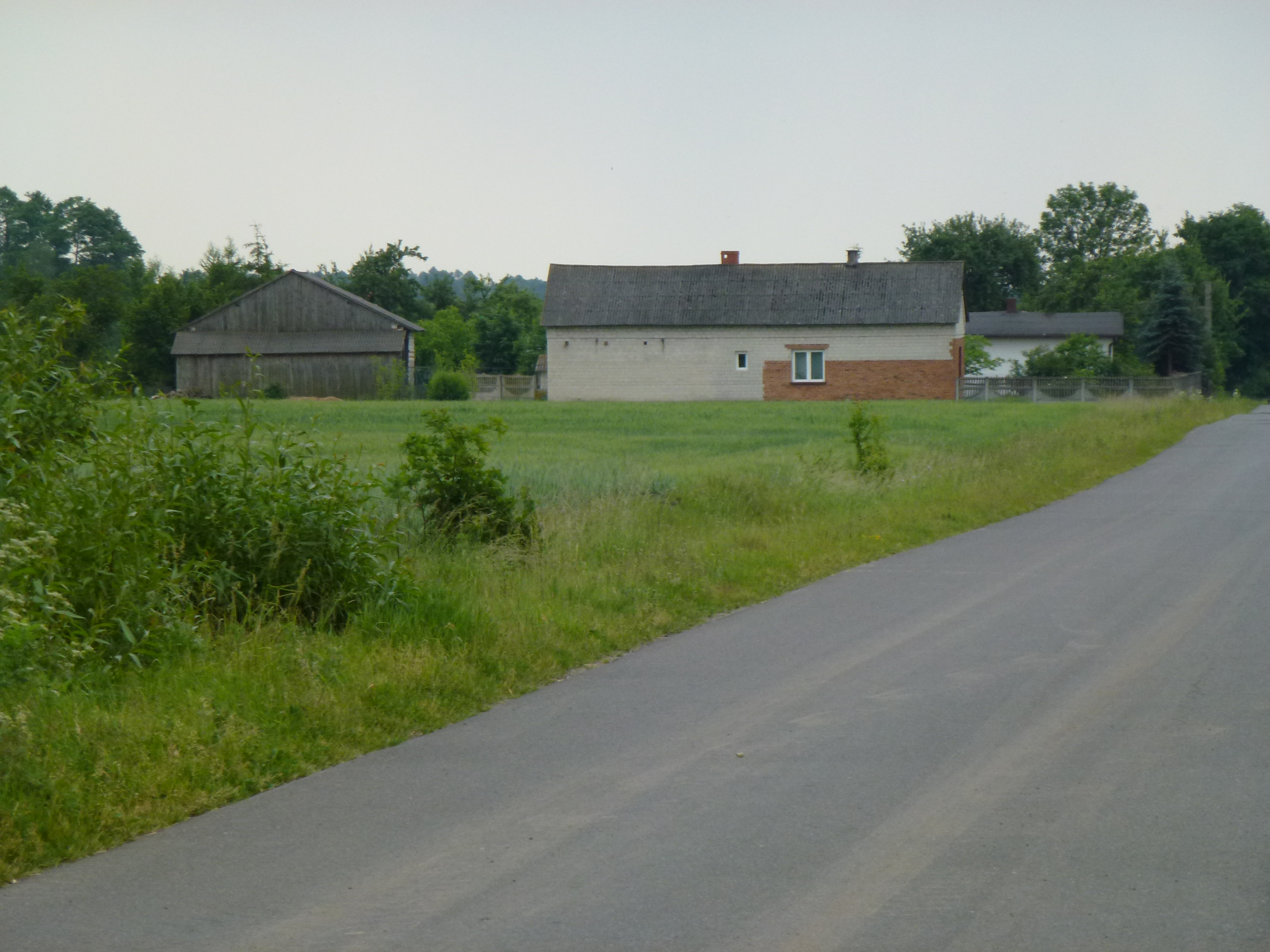

- Location within Poland
- Coordinates: 51°31′N 19°30′E
- Country: Poland
- Voivodeship: Łódź
- County: Piotrków
- Gmina: Grabica

Majdany (Polish pronunciation: [majˈdanɨ]) is a village in the administrative district of Gmina Grabica, within Piotrków County, Łódź Voivodeship, in central Poland.
