= Szydłów, Piotrków County =

Szydłów
- Village
- Location within Poland
- Coordinates: 51°27′N 19°36′E
- Country: Poland
- Voivodeship: Łódź
- County: Piotrków
- Gmina: Grabica

Szydłów [ˈʂɨdwuf] is a village in the administrative district of Gmina Grabica, within Piotrków County, Łódź Voivodeship, in central Poland.
