= Polesie, Piotrków County =

Polesie
- Village
- Location within Poland
- Coordinates: 51°26′N 19°38′E
- Country: Poland
- Voivodeship: Łódź
- County: Piotrków
- Gmina: Grabica

Polesie [pɔˈlɛɕɛ] is a village in the administrative district of Gmina Grabica, within Piotrków County, Łódź Voivodeship, in central Poland.
