= Majków Mały =

- Village
- Location within Poland
- Coordinates: 51°36′21″N 19°37′10″E
- Country: Poland
- Voivodeship: Łódź
- County: Piotrków
- Gmina: Grabica

Majków Mały (Polish pronunciation: [ˈmajkuf ˈmawɨ]) is a village in the administrative district of Gmina Grabica, within Piotrków County, Łódź Voivodeship, in central Poland.
