= Szydłów-Kolonia =

- Village
- Location within Poland
- Coordinates: 51°26′45″N 19°35′56″E
- Country: Poland
- Voivodeship: Łódź
- County: Piotrków
- Gmina: Grabica

Szydłów-Kolonia [ˈʂɨdwuf kɔˈlɔɲa] is a village in the administrative district of Gmina Grabica, within Piotrków County, Łódź Voivodeship, in central Poland.
