= Lutosławice Szlacheckie =

- Village
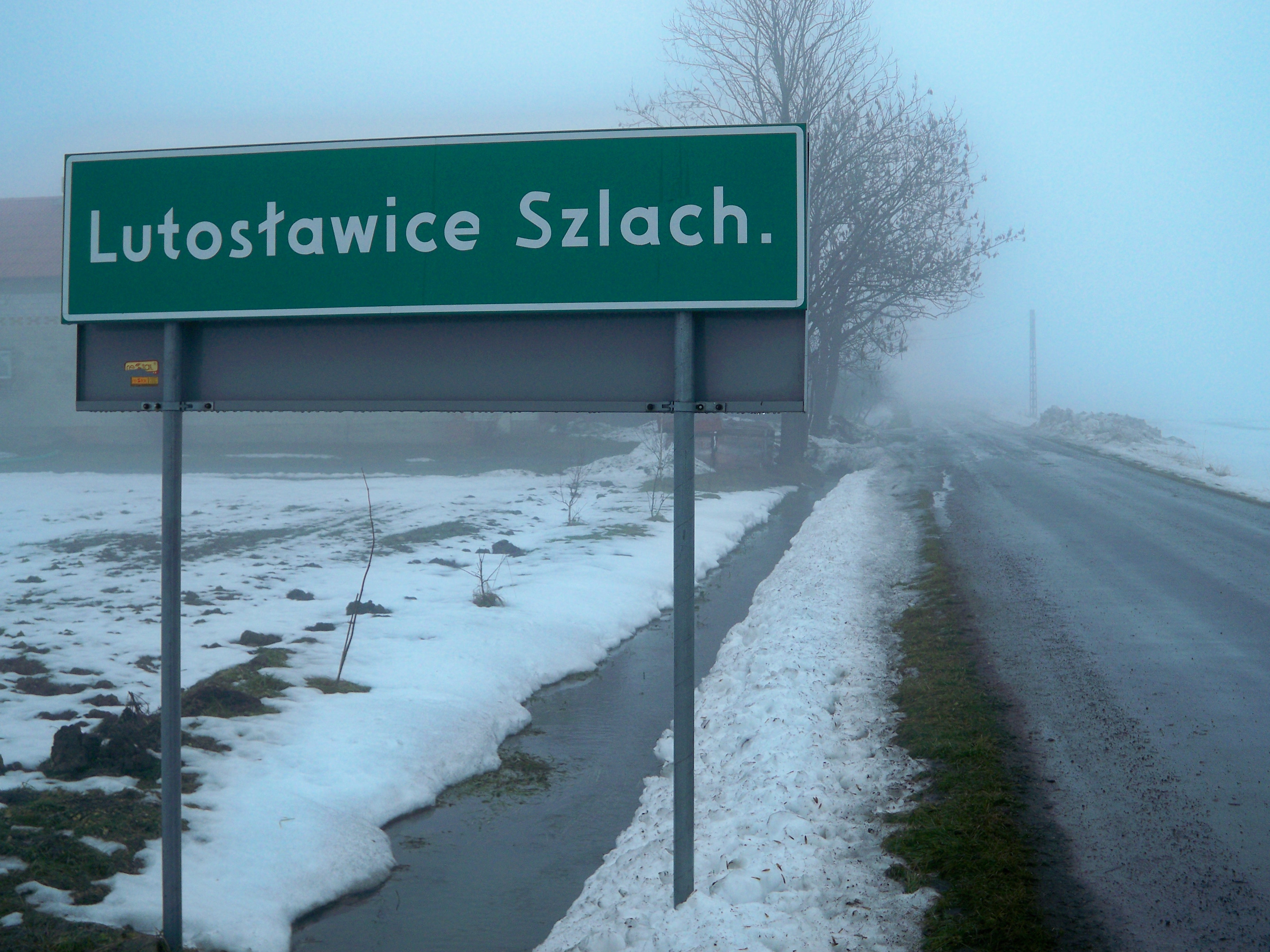

- Location within Poland
- Coordinates: 51°30′52″N 19°33′12″E
- Country: Poland
- Voivodeship: Łódź
- County: Piotrków
- Gmina: Grabica

Lutosławice Szlacheckie [lutɔswaˈvit͡sɛ ʂlaˈxɛt͡skʲɛ] is a village in the administrative district of Gmina Grabica, within Piotrków County, Łódź Voivodeship, in central Poland.
