= Ostrów, Gmina Grabica =

Ostrów
- Village
- Location within Poland
- Coordinates: 51°27′35″N 19°32′44″E
- Country: Poland
- Voivodeship: Łódź
- County: Piotrków
- Gmina: Grabica
- Population: 210

Ostrów [ˈɔstruf] is a village in the administrative district of Gmina Grabica, within Piotrków County, Łódź Voivodeship, in central Poland.
