= Kobyłki Duże =

- Village
- Location within Poland
- Coordinates: 51°26′12″N 19°29′21″E
- Country: Poland
- Voivodeship: Łódź
- County: Piotrków
- Gmina: Grabica
- Population: 100

Kobyłki Duże [kɔˈbɨu̯ki ˈduʐɛ] is a village in the administrative district of Gmina Grabica, within Piotrków County, Łódź Voivodeship, in central Poland.
