= Majków Średni =

- Village
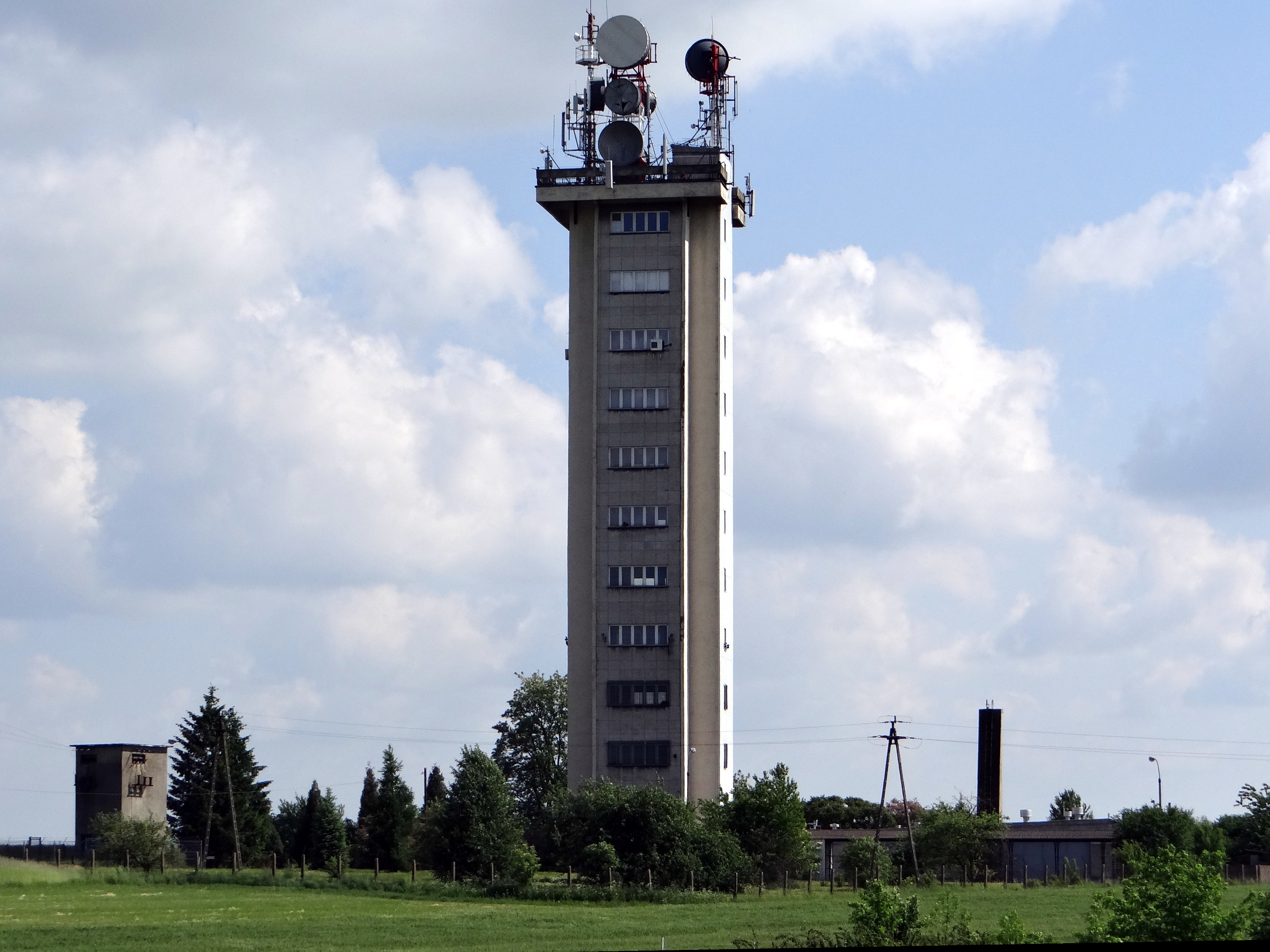

- Location within Poland
- Coordinates: 51°25′58″N 19°36′12″E
- Country: Poland
- Voivodeship: Łódź
- County: Piotrków
- Gmina: Grabica

Majków Średni (Polish pronunciation: [ˈmajkuf ˈɕrɛdɲi]) is a village in the administrative district of Gmina Grabica, within Piotrków County, Łódź Voivodeship, in central Poland.
