= Doły Brzeskie =

- Village
- Location within Poland
- Coordinates: 51°28′51″N 19°37′38″E
- Country: Poland
- Voivodeship: Łódź
- County: Piotrków
- Gmina: Grabica

Doły Brzeskie [ˈdɔwɨ ˈbʐɛskʲɛ] is a village in the administrative district of Gmina Grabica, within Piotrków County, Łódź Voivodeship, in central Poland.
