= Lubonia, Łódź Voivodeship =

Lubonia
- Village
- Location within Poland
- Coordinates: 51°30′12″N 19°32′10″E
- Country: Poland
- Voivodeship: Łódź
- County: Piotrków
- Gmina: Grabica
- Population: 80

Lubonia [luˈbɔɲa] is a village in the administrative district of Gmina Grabica, within Piotrków County, Łódź Voivodeship, in central Poland.
