= Rusociny =

- Village
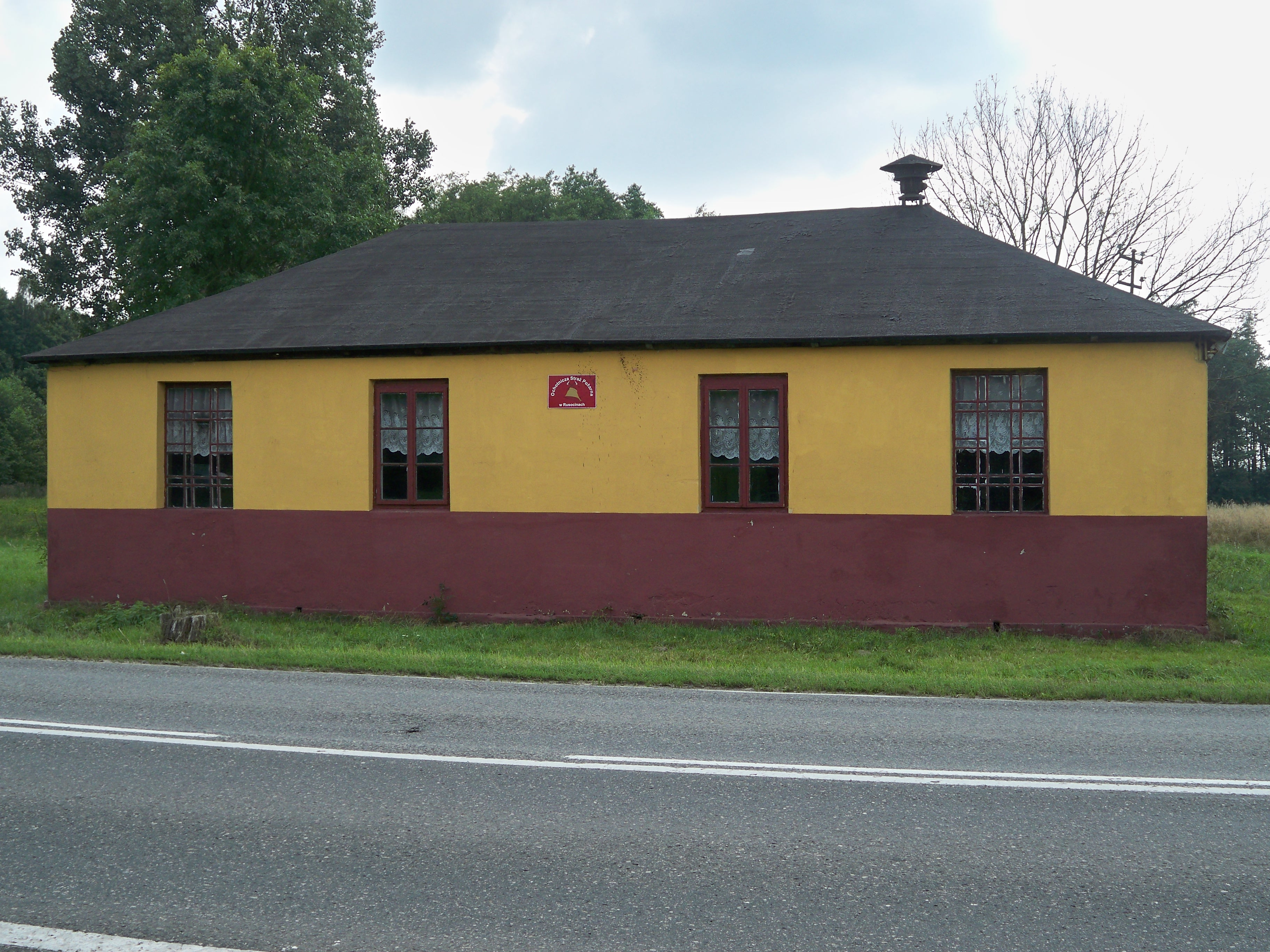
- Fire station

- Location within Poland
- Coordinates: 51°30′N 19°30′E
- Country: Poland
- Voivodeship: Łódź
- County: Piotrków
- Gmina: Grabica

Rusociny [rusɔˈt͡ɕinɨ] is a village in the administrative district of Gmina Grabica, within Piotrków County, Łódź Voivodeship, in central Poland.
