= Gmina Grabica =

Gmina Grabica Grabica Commune
- Gmina

- Flag Coat of arms
- Interactive map of Gmina Grabica
- Coordinates (Grabica): 51°29′47″N 19°32′47″E
- Country: Poland
- Voivodeship: Łódź
- County: Piotrków County
- Seat: Grabica

Area
  - Total: 127.24 km^{2} (49.13 sq mi)

Population (2006)
  - Total: 6,087
  - Density: 47.84/km^{2} (123.9/sq mi)
- Time zone: UTC+1 (CET)
  - Summer (DST): UTC+2 (CEST)
- Website: www.gmina.grabica.propl.com

Gmina Grabica is a rural gmina (administrative district) in Piotrków County, Łódź Voivodeship, in central Poland. Its seat is the village of Grabica, which lies approximately 15 kilometres (9 mi) north-west of Piotrków Trybunalski and 33 km (21 mi) south of the regional capital Łódź.

The gmina covers an area of 127.24 square kilometres (49.1 sq mi), and as of 2006 its total population is 6,087.

== Villages ==
Gmina Grabica contains the villages and settlements of:

- Boryszów, Brzoza
- Cisowa
- Doły Brzeskie
- Dziewuliny
- Dziwle
- Grabica
- Gutów Duży
- Gutów Mały
- Kafar
- Kamocin
- Kamocinek
- Kobyłki Duże
- Kociołki
- Krzepczów
- Lubanów
- Lubonia
- Lutosławice Rządowe
- Lutosławice Szlacheckie
- Majdany
- Majków Mały
- Majków Średni
- Majków-Folwark
- Maleniec
- Olendry
- Ostrów
- Papieże
- Polesie
- Rusociny
- Szydłów
- Szydłów-Kolonia
- Twardosławice
- Władysławów
- Wola Bykowska
- Wola Kamocka
- Zaborów
- Żądło
- Żeronie
- Żychlin

== Neighbouring gminas ==
Gmina Grabica is bordered by the city of Piotrków Trybunalski and by the gminas of Bełchatów, Dłutów, Drużbice, Moszczenica, Tuszyn and Wola Krzysztoporska.
