= Grabica, Piotrków County =

Grabica
- Village
- Location within Poland
- Coordinates: 51°29′47″N 19°32′47″E
- Country: Poland
- Voivodeship: Łódź
- County: Piotrków
- Gmina: Grabica
- Population (approx.): 390

Grabica [ɡraˈbit͡sa] is a village in Piotrków County, Łódź Voivodeship, in central Poland. It is the seat of the gmina (administrative district) called Gmina Grabica.

The village has an approximate population of 390.
