= Maleniec, Łódź Voivodeship =

Maleniec
- Village
- Location within Poland
- Coordinates: 51°32′N 19°28′E
- Country: Poland
- Voivodeship: Łódź
- County: Piotrków
- Gmina: Grabica

Maleniec [maˈlɛɲɛt͡s] is a village in the administrative district of Gmina Grabica, within Piotrków County, Łódź Voivodeship, in central Poland.
