= Żychlin, Piotrków County =

Żychlin
- Village
- Location within Poland
- Coordinates: 51°27′25″N 19°37′1″E
- Country: Poland
- Voivodeship: Łódź
- County: Piotrków
- Gmina: Grabica

Żychlin [ˈʐɨxlin] is a village in the administrative district of Gmina Grabica, within Piotrków County, Łódź Voivodeship, in central Poland.
