= Cisowa, Gdynia =

Cisowa
- District of Gdynia
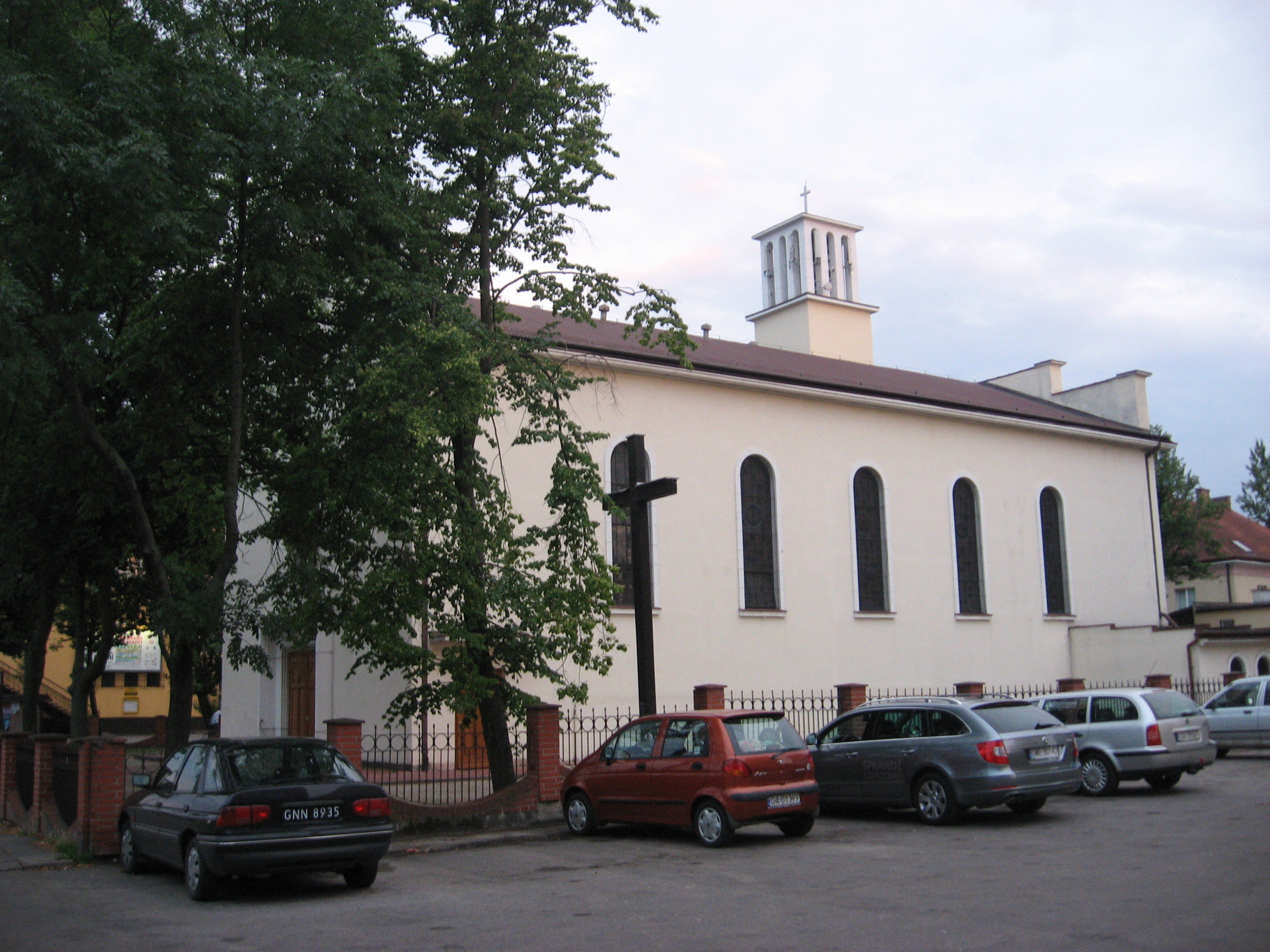
- Church of the Transfiguration in Cisowa

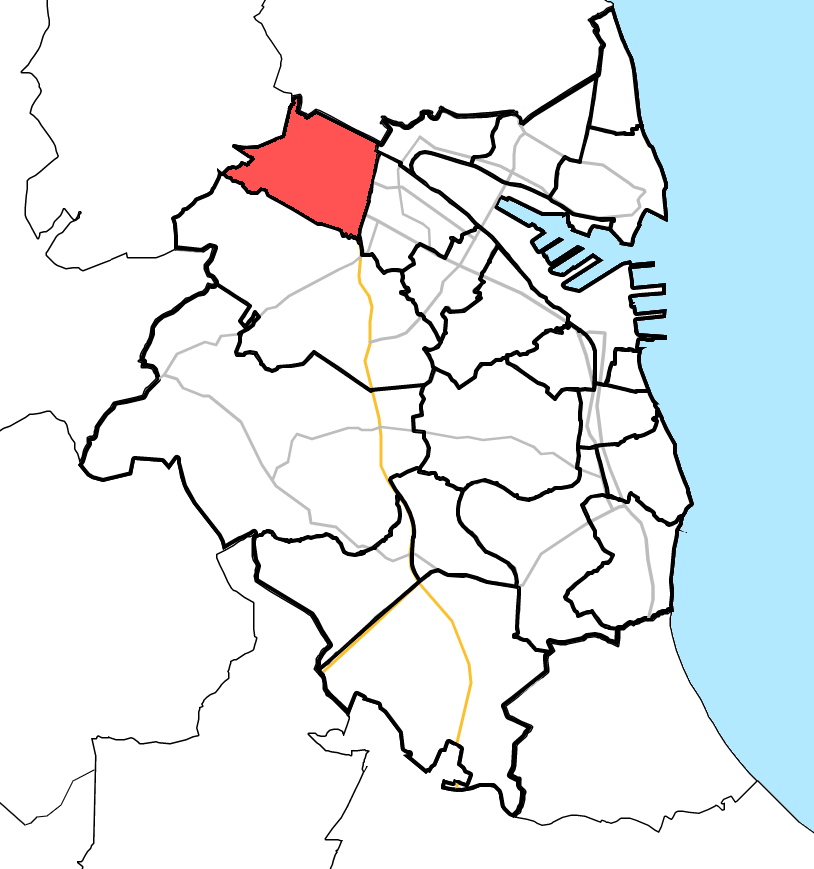
- Location of Cisowa within Gdynia
- Coordinates: 54°32′59″N 18°25′47″E
- Country: Poland
- Voivodeship: Pomeranian
- County/City: Gdynia
- Within city limits: 1935

Area
  - Total: 5.78 km^{2} (2.23 sq mi)

Population (2022)
  - Total: 10,975
  - Density: 1,900/km^{2} (4,920/sq mi)
- Time zone: UTC+1 (CET)
  - Summer (DST): UTC+2 (CEST)
- Vehicle registration: GA

Cisowa [t͡ɕiˈsɔva] is a district of Gdynia, Poland, located in the north-western part of the city.

Cisowa was a royal village of the Kingdom of Poland, administratively located in the Gdynia city in the Pomeranian Voivodeship.

== Demographics ==
Historical population
Year	Pop.
1921	564
2022	10,975

== Transport ==
The Gdynia Cisowa railway station is located in Cisowa.
