= Gdynia Cisowa railway station =

Railway station in Gdynia, Poland

Gdynia Cisowa
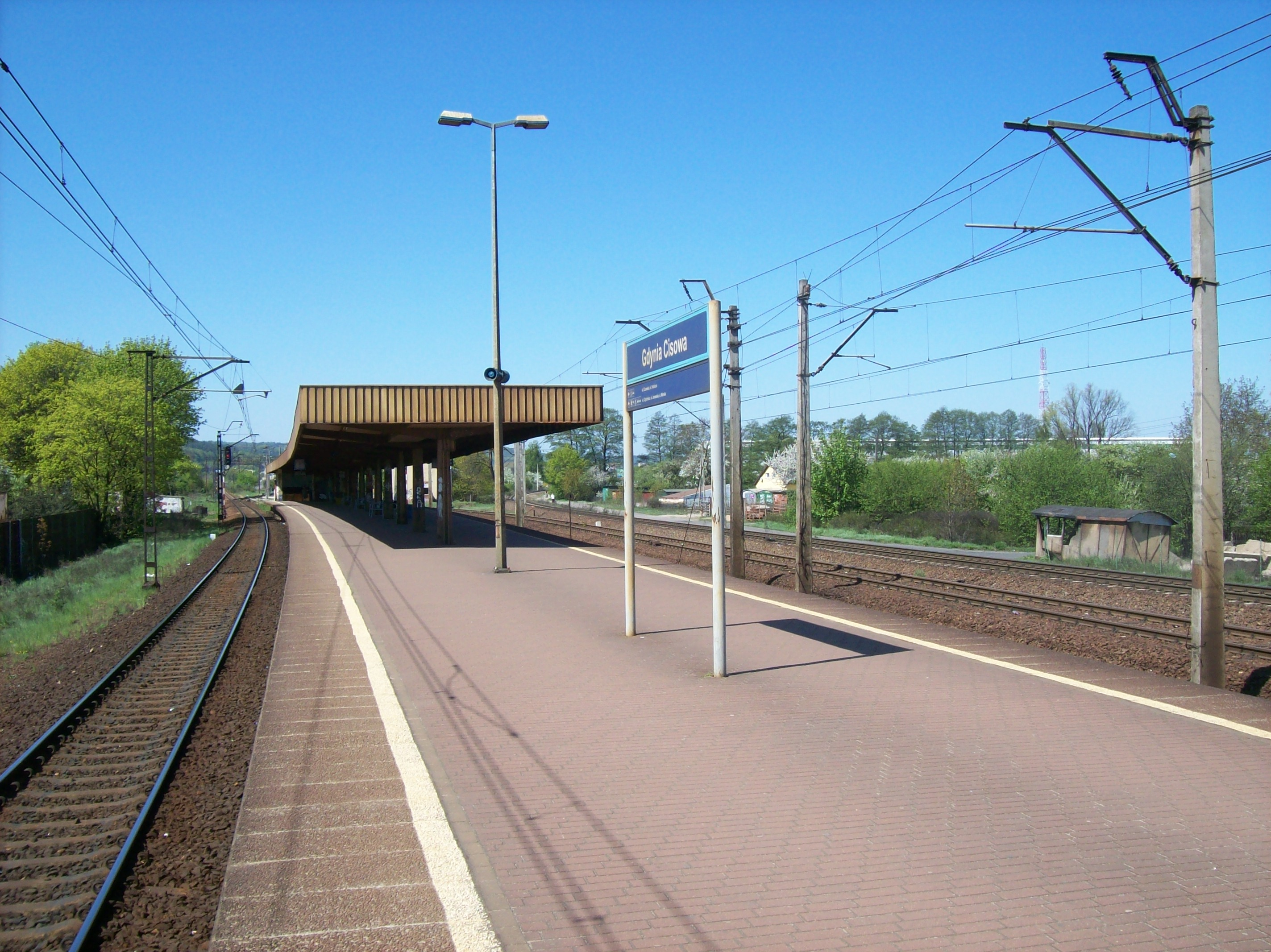
- Gdynia Cisowa railway station

General information
- Location: Gdynia, Pomeranian Voivodeship; Poland
- System: Railway Station
- Operator: SKM Tricity
- Line: 250: Gdańsk Śródmieście–Rumia railway
- Platforms: 2

History
- Opened: 22 December 1997; 28 years ago
Location
- Location within Poland

Gdynia Cisowa railway station is a railway station serving the city of Gdynia, in the Pomeranian Voivodeship, Poland. The station opened on 22 December 1997 and is located in the Cisowa district on the Gdańsk Śródmieście–Rumia railway. The train services are operated by SKM Tricity.

== Train services ==
The station is served by the following service(s):

- Szybka Kolej Miejska services (SKM) (Lębork -) Wejherowo - Reda - Rumia - Gdynia - Sopot - Gdansk

Preceding station	SKM Tricity	Following station
Rumia Janowo towards Wejherowo or Lębork	SKM Tricity	Gdynia Chylonia towards Gdańsk Śródmieście
