= Gutów Mały =

- Village
- Location within Poland
- Coordinates: 51°30′47″N 19°29′0″E
- Country: Poland
- Voivodeship: Łódź
- County: Piotrków
- Gmina: Grabica
- Population: 80

Gutów Mały [ˈɡutuf ˈmawɨ] is a village in the administrative district of Gmina Grabica, within Piotrków County, Łódź Voivodeship, in central Poland.
