= Bombardier Transportation Polska =

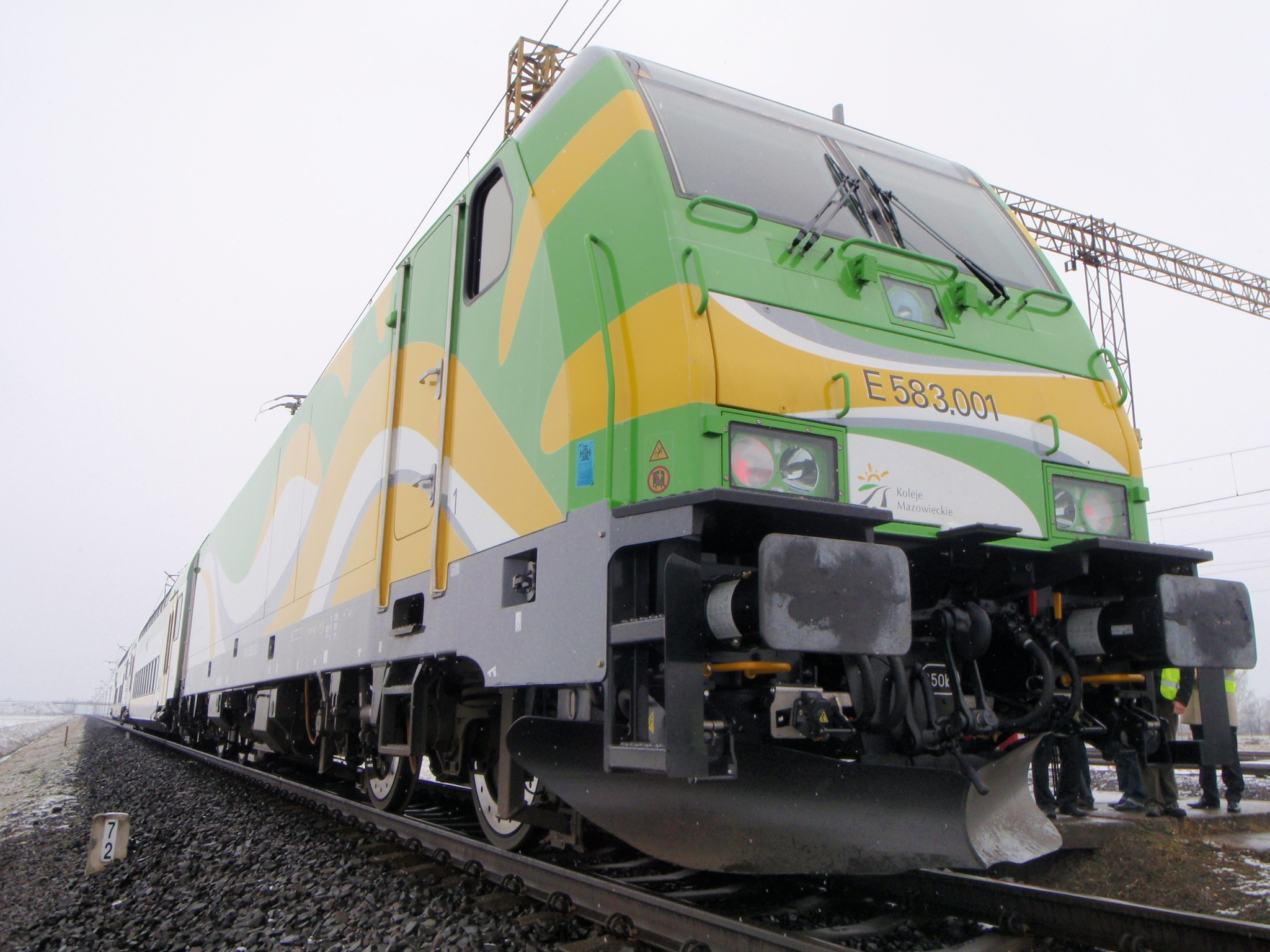
- Headquarters: Poland
- Website: http://www.bombardier.com/

Bombardier Transportation Polska is the Polish division of Bombardier Transportation. It comprises the former Pafawag factory in Wrocław and another facility in Łódź as Bombardier Transportation Polska Sp. z o.o. and another manufacturing plant Bombardier Transportation (ZWUS) Polska Sp. z o.o. in Katowice. In February 2011, Bombardier bought out PKP's 60% stake in ZWUS.
