= List of Tricity Rapid Urban Railway railway stations =

The Tricity Rapid Urban Railway is a commuter railway in Tricity, Poland. Its railway stations are served as follows:

== Gdańsk - Wejherowo (Lębork) line ==
=== Gdańsk ===
- Gdańsk Śródmieście
- Gdańsk Główny
- Gdańsk Stocznia
- Gdańsk Politechnika
- Gdańsk Wrzeszcz
- Gdańsk Zaspa
- Gdańsk Przymorze-Uniwersytet
- Gdańsk Oliwa
- Gdańsk Żabianka AWFiS

=== Sopot ===
- Sopot Wyścigi
- Sopot
- Sopot Kamienny Potok

=== Gdynia ===
- Gdynia Orłowo
- Gdynia Redłowo
- Gdynia Wzgórze św. Maksymiliana
- Gdynia Główna
- Gdynia Stocznia
- Gdynia Grabówek
- Gdynia Leszczynki
- Gdynia Chylonia
- Gdynia Cisowa

=== Rumia ===
- Rumia Janowo
- Rumia

=== Reda ===
- Reda
- Reda Pieleszewo

=== Wejherowo ===
- Wejherowo Śmiechowo
- Wejherowo Nanice
- Wejherowo

=== Gościcino ===
- Gościcino Wejherowskie

=== Luzino ===
- Luzino

=== Strzebielino ===
- Strzebielino Morskie

=== Bożepole Wielkie ===
- Bożepole Wielkie

=== Godętowo ===
- Godętowo

=== Lębork ===
- Lębork Mosty
- Lębork

== Gdańsk - Nowy Port line ==
- Gdańsk Główny
- Gdańsk Stocznia
- Gdańsk Nowe Szkoty
- Gdańsk Kolonia
- Gdańsk Zaspa Towarowa
- Gdańsk Brzeźno
- Gdańsk Nowy Port
