= Nowe Szkoty =

District of Gdansk in Poland

Coordinates: 54°23′N 18°37′E

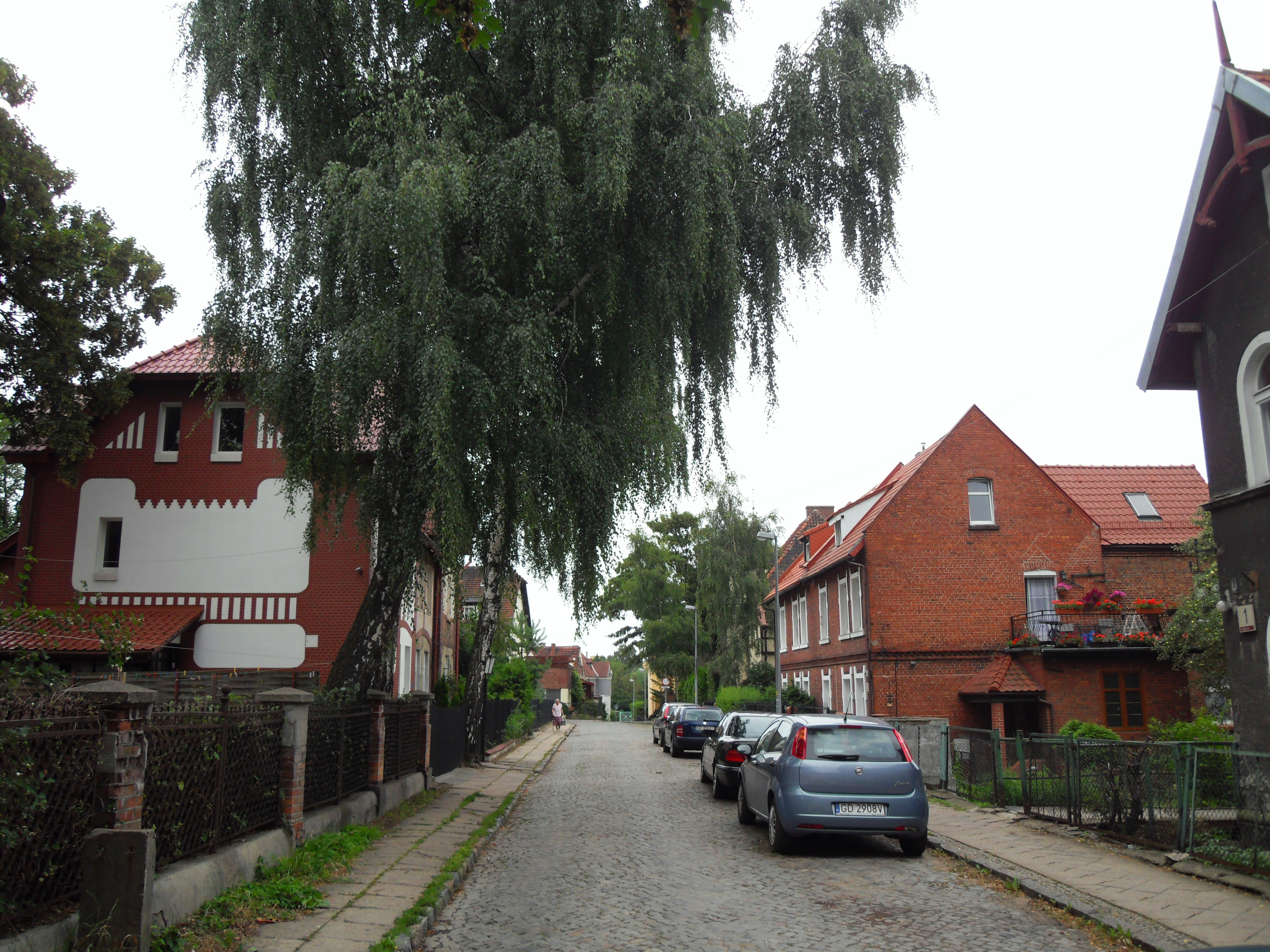
Garden city of Nowe Szkoty

Nowe Szkoty (German: Neu Schottland/Neuschottland; English: New Scotland; Kashubian: Nowi Szotland) is one of the neighbourhoods of the city of Gdańsk, Poland. It belongs to the administrative district of Wrzeszcz Dolny since 2010.

== History ==
Neu Schottland was a settlement between Kleinhammer and Schellmühl. A mill (Abtsmühle) nearby was established in the second half of the 16th century by the abbots or the abbey of Oliva. The mill pond was filled by the Strzyża stream (Strießbach) and the Königstaler Bach. The name of the place comes from the Scottish settlers. An older settlement in the south of Gdańsk (in the district of Orunia-Św. Wojciech-Lipce) was named Stare Szkoty (Alt Schottland – Old Scotland). Neu Schottland was divided into two parts. The northern part on the left bank of the Striessbach was owned by the abbey and the southern part by the village of Zigankenberg.

In the 17th century Neu Schottland came into the possession of the Kostka family and in the 18th century to the Weyher family (Polish: Wejher). In the middle of the 18th century, the Strießbach was moved to the northern edge of the settlement. In 1772 Neu Schottland had a population of 280. There was a mansion surrounded by a park.

In 1733, the Saxon army camped near New Scotland (Siege of Danzig). As a result of the 1st Partition of Poland in 1772 the area became part of Prussia. In 1807, Napoleon stayed in one of the local estates near Oliva. It is a legend, that he was of lodging in the mansion. In 1813, the Russian army took over the area. Field fortifications had been built near Neu Schottland.

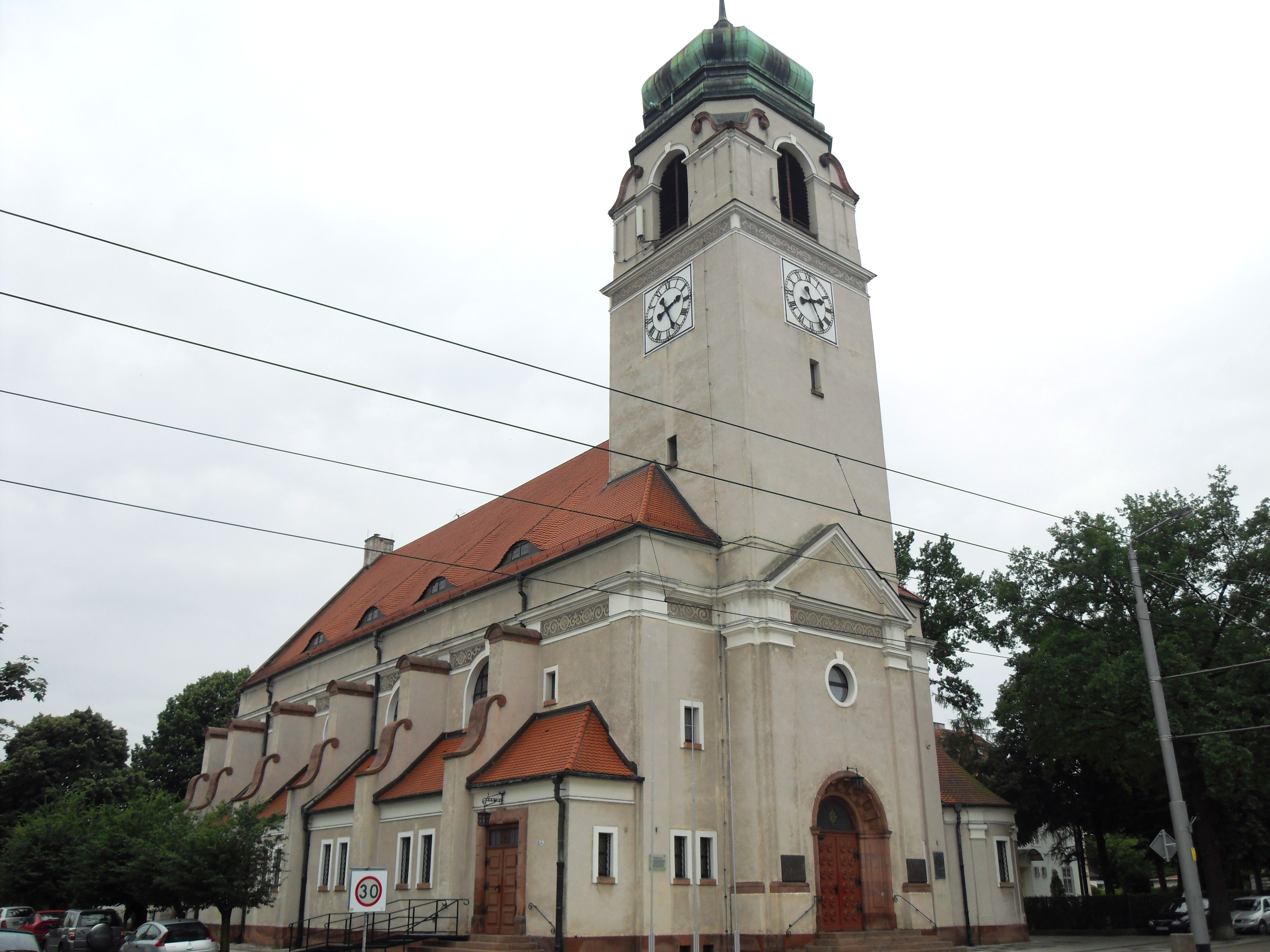
św. Andrzeja Boboli

In 1814, the main part of Neu Schottland came to the city of Gdansk together with Wrzeszcz (Langfuhr). The remaining areas were not incorporated until 1877. At the beginning of the 20th century, a garden city cooperative built numerous duplexes north of the Strießbach. Max-Halbe-Platz, which is now called plac Komorowski, emerged from the crossroads between Oliva, Hochstrieß, Brunshof, Kleinhammer and Saspe. The area of Neu Schottland was expanded eastwards until the mid-20th century. This included the Reichskolonie (or Kolonie Neuschottland, Polish: Kolonia), another garden city. The railway line to the Port of Gdańsk in Neufahrwasser on October 1, 1867. The area had the stations Neuschottland and Haltestelle Schellmühl (Reichskolonie).

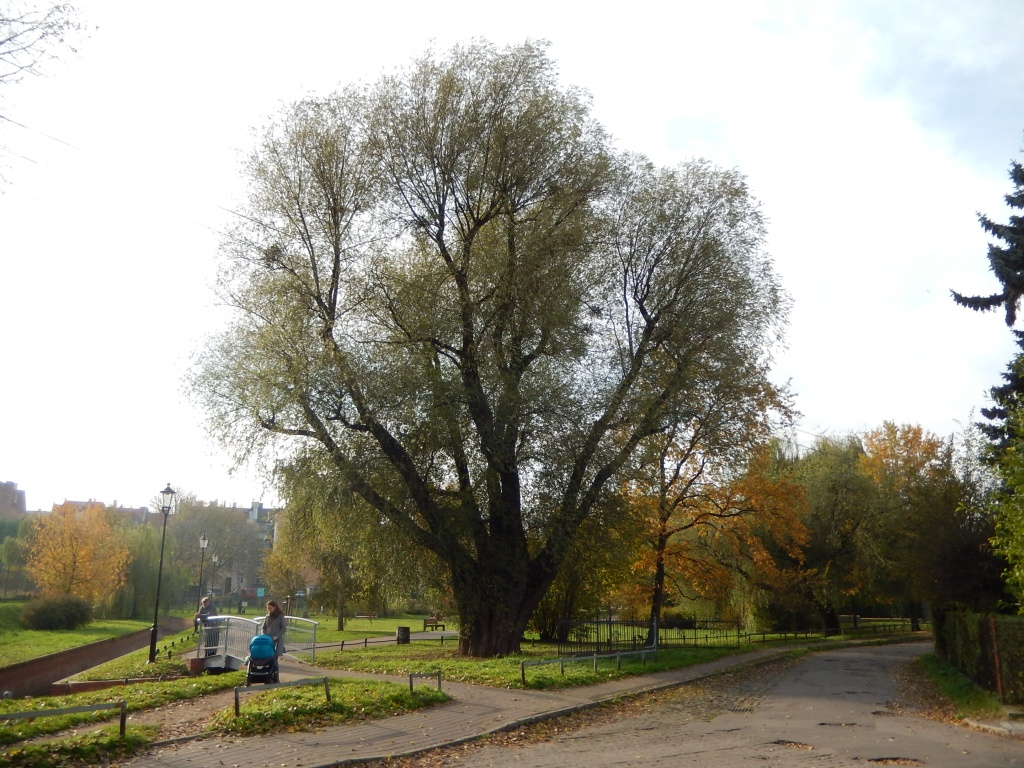
Park nad Strzyżą

In 1907, the Neuschottland school was established. The Evangelical church Christuskirche was inaugurated on July 31, 1916. In April 1945 it was consecrated to the property of the Society of Jesus and Andrew Bobola. The Roman Catholic św. Andrzeja Boboli church is a protected architectural monument since 2005. The Helene-Lange-Schule was completed in 1929. The high school for girls was built entirely on Bauhaus design principles. It is home to the pharmaceutical faculty of the Medical University of Gdańsk since 1947.

In the 1920s, an alley was marked out on the eastern edge of Neuschottland. The Ostseestrasse leading to the Baltic Sea in Brzeźno (Brösen) was only completed after the war. Since 1990, it is named aleja Józefa Hallera. In 2001 the Park nad Strzyżą was created in the south of the Strzyża stream.

In addition to a number of tram stops, there is the Gdańsk Politechnika SKM stop in the south of Nowe Szkoty. The station opened in 1952 and is located on the main line. The port railway was reopened in 1951. The two stations had been closed since 2006 and 2005. This also applies when the route is opened to major sport events and trade fairs.

== Points of interest ==
- Church św. Andrzeja Boboli
- Gdańsk Medical University, pharmaceutical faculty
- Park nad Strzyżą.
