= Saint Anthony parish, Gdynia =

Coordinates: 54.5067°N 18.5401°E

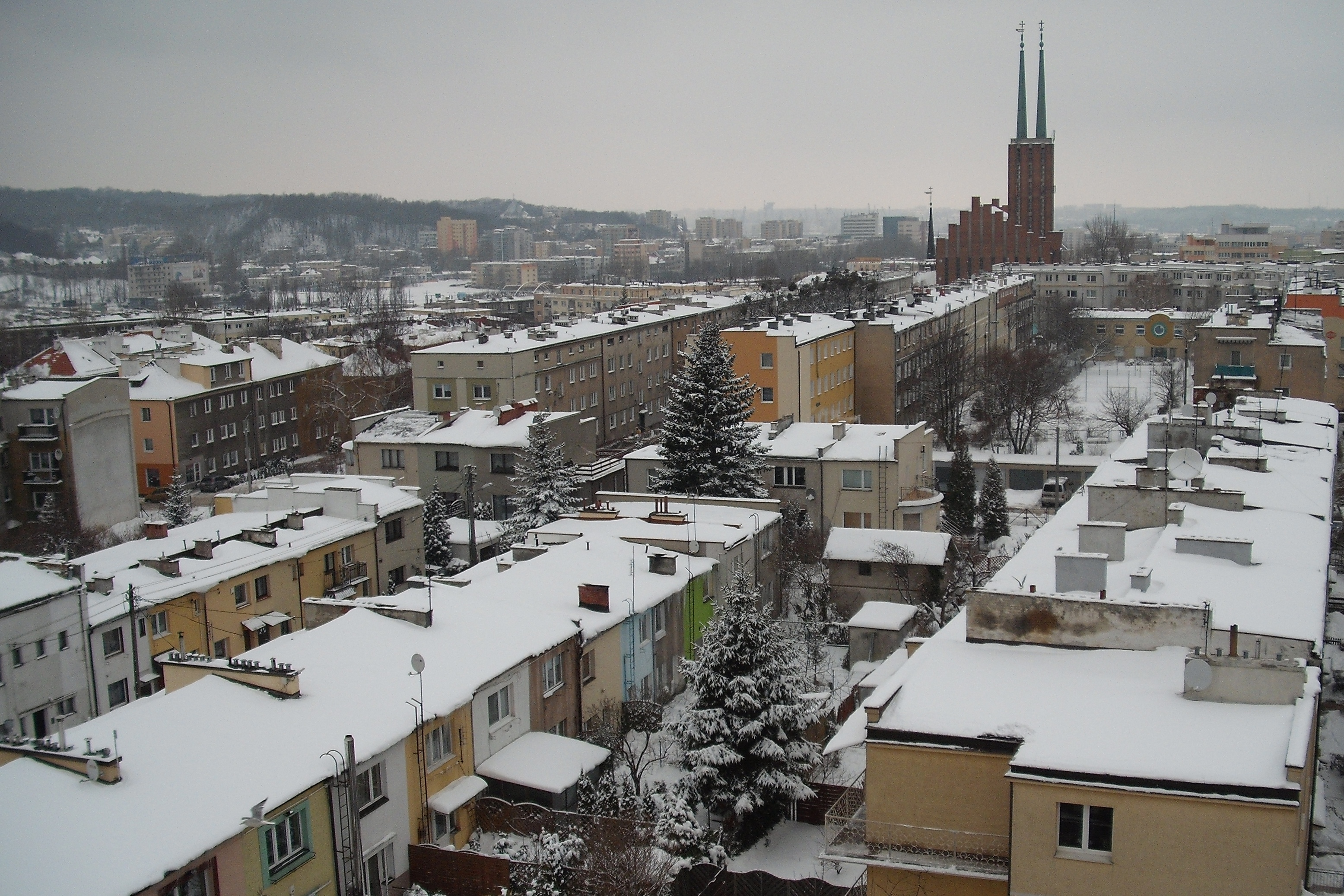
Gdynia, Saint Anthony church and parish

The parish of Saint Anthony of Padua in Gdynia (Polish: parafia pw. św. Antoniego Padewskiego w Gdyni) is a Roman Catholic religious administrative unit and community, located in the Archdiocese of Gdańsk. Centered on the Conventual Franciscans' friary and church of Saint Anthony, it chiefly covers the Gdynia district of Wzgórze św. Maksymiliana. It is recognized for numerous social and religious activities ranging from ministry to culture, education and charity. The church building, towering above large part of the city, is known as one of Gdynia's landmarks. Its peculiarity was that it periodically hosted two churches one above another.

== Parish: history and profile ==
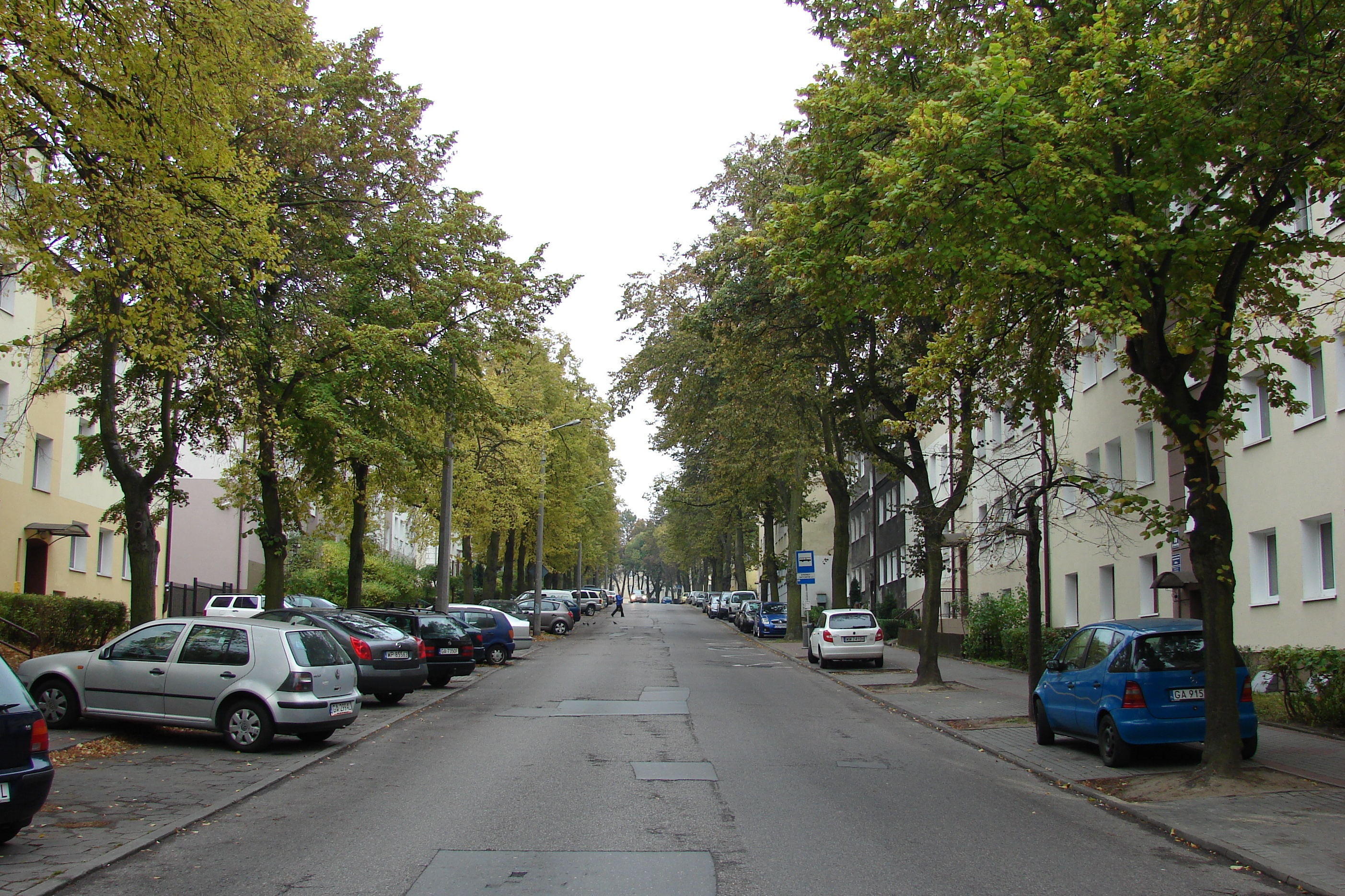
parish, early post-war development

Since early 13th century the area now forming the parish was part of Archangel Michael parish, based in the village of Oxhöft/Oksywie. In 1926 the largely uninhabited neighbourhood was incorporated into the newly established Holy Mary Queen of Poland parish, centred on the new church located in the very heart of what at that time was a fishing village rapidly turning into a modern city of Gdynia. First residential quarters were constructed on what was then known as Marshal Foch Hill in the 1930s, but the area underwent massive development in the 1940s, first during the German rule and especially in the first post-war years. The Franciscans applied to ecclesiastical authorities requesting setting up of a new parish; as since 1921 Gdynia formed part of the Culm Bishopry, in December 1948 the Culm bishop Kazimierz Kowalski carved out the district from the Holy Mary parish and set up the new one of St Anthony, territorially roughly corresponding to the currently existing municipal districts of Wzgórze św. Maksymiliana and Redłowo. Its population remained unclear and probably stood at around 5,000, most of them young people freshly migrated from other locations in Pomerania and elsewhere.

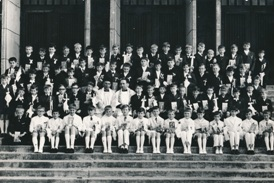
first communion in the parish, 1970s (boys only)

The monastery and church of St Anthony proved to be an important integrating factor for the growing migrant community of the area; apart from few schools there were no other institutions which might have served as agglutinatory force. The Franciscans launched a number of activities intended for the lay and gaining momentum throughout the 1950s, including cultural groups like orchestra and choir, prayer societies like rosary circles, charity organisations and evangelic associations; the friars organized pilgrimages, embarked on various popular art initiatives and education, especially for the children. Since the mid-1950s inhabitants were increasingly engaged in voluntary work at construction of the new church, while religious feasts like Corpus Christi and events like first communion or confirmation provided opportunity for large gatherings of the local population. The number of christenings kept growing until the mid-1950s, when it exceeded 400 per annum; the number of marriages kept growing until the early 1970s, when it exceeded 200 per annum. During the 1970 riots immediate surroundings of the church turned into battlefield between protesters and security forces; some tear gas shells exploded in the building, some people sought refuge at the premises and the guardian negotiated their withdrawal with commanding police officers. During the strikes of 1980 the parish priest served in many state-ran industrial enterprises. In the early 1980s total population of the parish stood at its peak nearing 20,000 people; in 1981 the number dropped to some 14,000 as a new parish was carved out in Redłowo. In 2018 the number of households in the parish was around 5,700.

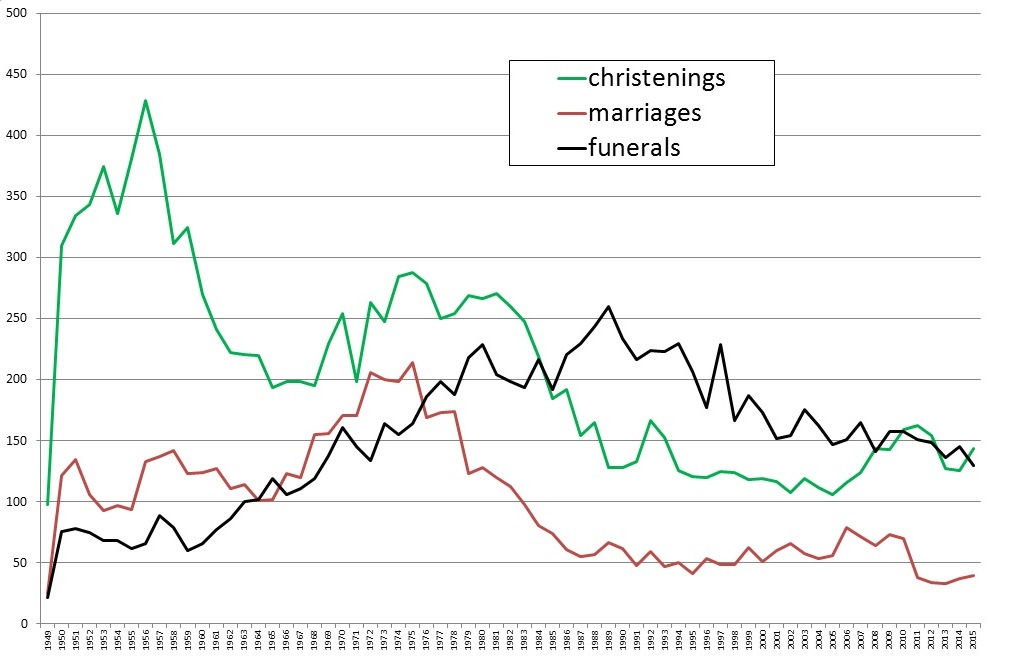
parish demographics, 1949–2015

The last two decades of the 20th century stand out as the period of particularly diversified and thriving activities of both the friars and the lay. Franciszkański Zakon Świeckich went on with evangelical mission, Akcja Katolicka organised multifold activities, Żywy Różaniec, Odnowa w Duchu Świętym, Grupa Modlitewna o. Pio and Wspólnota dla Intronizacji Najświętszego Serca served as prayer groups, Fraternia catered for the academic youth, Wspólnota Młodzieży Franciszkańskiej Tau provided a platform modeled after St. Francis, Poradnia Życia Rodzinnego, Kręgi Domowego Kościoła, Wspólnota Rodzin and Wspólnota Adopcji Duchowej enhanced family values as mutual support community services, Rycerstwo Niepokalanej, SOS Franciszkańskie and Caritas served differently formatted charity purposes, "Promyki" was formed as holiday establishment for children, Franciszkańska Grupa Pielgrzymki organized pilgrimages, Ze Wzgórza emerged as a parish bulletin and local section of Radio Maryja supported the nationwide broadcasting network. The Symfonia choir and the orchestra were already iconic parish institutions; other musical initiatives were ancient music band Ad te, Domine, Międzynarodowy Festiwal Muzyki Sakralnej and Młodzieżowa Scena Muzyczna, admitting also non-religious music groups; Franciszkańskie Centrum Kultury emerged as major urban cultural institution of its own. Periodically the monastery hosted a cafe-bar. Services for handicapped children and services for the blind, deaf and mute, animated by Bruno Pawłowicz, became trademark of the monastery, reaching beyond parish and serving the entire Gdynia community.

parish priests
no	name	term
1	Alojzy Urbaniak	1949–1968
2	Wawrzyniec Kurach	1968–1969
3	Stanisław Frejlich	1969–1974
4	Manswet Wardyn	1974–1983
5	Bolesław Mika	1983–1986
6	Hubert Fabian Lipiński	1986–1989
7	Lucjan Ubysz	1989–1996
8	Józef Brzozowski	1996–2004
9	Jan Maciejowski	2004–2012
10	Stanisław Kreft	2012–2015
11	Piotr Matuszak	2015–2024
12	Sebastian Fierek	2024–

In line with general re-organisation of national ecclesiastical administration, in 1992 the parish was removed from the Culm diocese and joined the Gdańsk bishopry, but more profound changes were yet to come. By the end of the 20th century the parish community was already undergoing major change. The 20-year-olds who settled in the area in the post-war years were already in their late 60s and started to pass away; secularisation of emergent consumer society took its toll among the middle-aged and the younger generation. In the late 1980s the number of dominicantes, the most basic statistical religiosity indicator, was estimated in the parish at some 40% compared to the national average of 50%. In the second decade of the 21st century the figure is estimated at some 25% compared to the 40% national average, though with the retired approaching 30% of the total parish population, Sunday mass attendance might also result from reduced mobility of the elderly. The change is also reflected in annual christenings falling below 100, annual marriages falling below 50 and annual funerals growing above 200. The number of children receiving the first communion during recent years ranges between 14 and 50, compared to almost 150 in the 1970s. The ratio of households admitting the 2016 kolęda was 41%. There are few signs of the trend getting reversed. One of them was spiritual service provided to the local football club Arka and the parish priest serving as chaplain of the society, usually associated rather with violence and hooliganism. Another one was Młodzieżowa Scena Muzyczna, a formula attracting a variety of youth music bands including sub-cultures like hip hop.

== Monastery and church: history ==
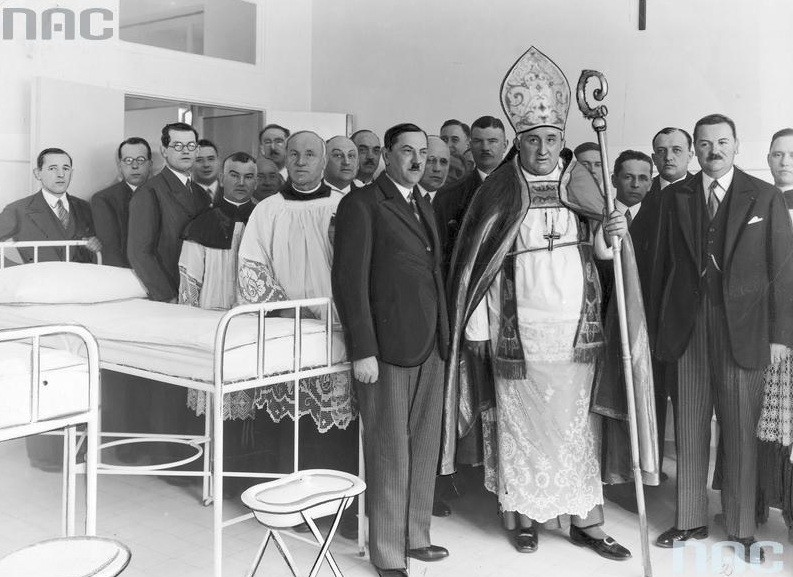
bishop Okoniewski in Gdynia, 1934

Conventual Franciscans operated a monastery in Gdańsk until the mid-16th century, when it was taken over by Protestant-dominated municipal authorities; the order kept claiming the building by appointing titular guardians later on. Following unsuccessful attempts to recover the monastery from the Free City of Danzig in the 1920s, in the early 1930s the local Provincial Superior Anzelm Kubit launched search for an alternative location, focusing on the rapidly growing Gdynia; he obtained appropriate permission from the Culm bishop, Stanisław Okoniewski. Despite initial plans centred on the village of Orłowo, in 1935 he purchased a plot of 7,3 thousand square meters on Northern slopes of a largely uninhabited hill towering over the city centre from the South. In 1936 the Minister General, Domenico Tavani, formally set up a convent. Architectural design envisioned a monastery and a large adjacent chapel; construction works, carried out with enormous financial, technical and manpower assistance of other Franciscan monasteries, especially from Niepokalanów and Łagiewniki, were completed in 1937. During the next few years the convent grew to 10 friars. In 1937 the chapel became a garrison church for 2. Morski Battalion Strzelców (2nd Sea Rifle Battalion), and the guardian became its chaplain.

Gdynia longest serving friars
no	name	years
1	K. Kassa	40
2	T. Zimnoch	33
3	O. Wysocki	25
4	F. Gut	24
4	A. Urbaniak	24

Following the German takeover of Gdynia in 1939 the Franciscans were immediately evicted and detained; at least 4 friars are known to have been executed in course of the war. The monastery was turned into a Bahnschutz school; the chapel first became a congress hall and then a gym. During withdrawal from Gdynia in early 1945 the German units robbed all interior equipment. In the spring of 1945 two friars from the Niepokalanów monastery were delegated to Gdynia to reclaim the building and carry out repair works; the chapel was re-opened in April that year and the convent was re-established, initially consisting of 5 friars. In 1948 the chapel became parish church of the newly created St Anthony parish, while monastery premises hosted also the developing community initiatives. The friars were already gathering funds and raw materials for construction of an adjacent church. The application for building permit, lodged in 1952, was processed by municipal authorities until 1956, when it was finally rejected; the Franciscans speculated that communist authorities objected to monumental size, supposed to dominate the city skyline.

convent guardians
no	name	term
1	Hugolin Czyż	1936–1939
2	Norbert Uliasz	1939
3	Oskar Wiśniewski	1945–1947
4	Gerard Domka	1947–1949
5	Alojzy Urbaniak	1949–1965
6	Stanisław Frejlich	1965–1968
7	Wawrzyniec Kurach	1968–1971
8	Manswet Wardyn	1971–1977
9	Innocenty Szumowski	1977–1983
10	Bolesław Mika	1983–1986
11	Hubert Fabian Lipiński	1986–1989
12	Lucjan Ubysz	1989–1996
13	Józef Brzozowski	1996–2004
14	Jan Maciejowski	2004–2012
15	Stanisław Kreft	2012–2016
16	Piotr Matuszak	2016–2024
17	Sebastian Fierek	2024–

The church design was entirely reworked and scaled down; with the new application lodged in late 1956, the building permit was granted in 1957. Construction works, financed by the Polish Franciscans, parish worshippers and emigrees from Canada and the United States, started almost immediately; ecclesiastical authorities feared reversal of slightly more conciliatory turn of the official policy, adopted towards the Church. In late 1958 the bottom level was provisionally opened as kościół dolny (lower church). In late 1960 kościół górny (upper church) was officially opened. In both cases further interior work was to continue for years to come; its final feature were glassworks, fitted in 1968. A new bell tower was not completed as planned; authorities demanded it did not grow above the main nave level, quoting interference with navy radio operations. In the late 1960s the monastery underwent major refurbishment. By end of the decade the convent reached its all-time height, amounting to 20 friars. During another thaw in relations between the communist authorities and the Church, in 1972 the navy dropped their alleged radio concerns; the bell tower was brought to its current shape in 1974. In 1973 a new chapel, dedicated to Maksymilian Kolbe, was opened next to main nave of the upper church; its opening coincided with elevating the church to the Sanctuary of Blessed Maksymilian status, in 2011 renamed to Sanctuary of Mary the Queen of Hope and Saint Maksymilian. In 1977 two bells, named Antoni and Franciszek, were mounted on the tower.

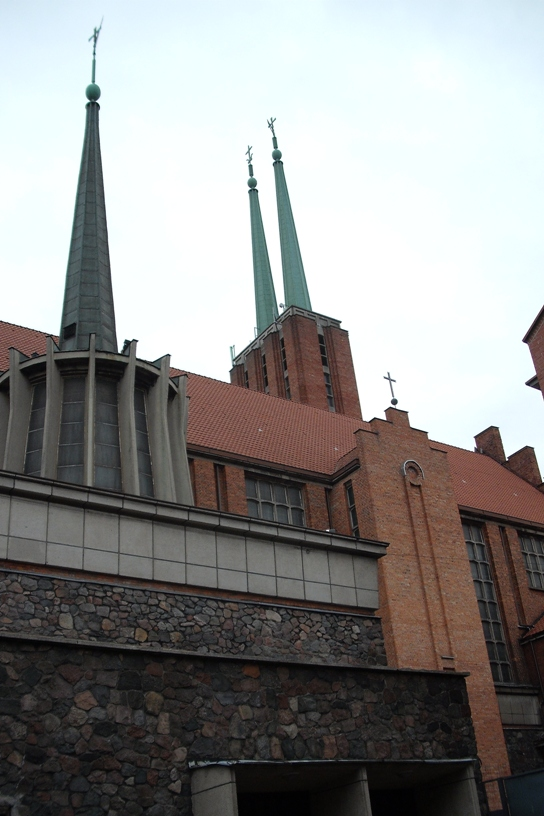
Western wall: new apse

In the late 1980s and the early 1990s the upper church underwent major change, stirring probably the largest controversy since the parish has been established. Due mostly to poor visibility from the aisle and the gallery, the nave was re-oriented and the main altar was removed from the Southern wall to the Western wall, with a new apse modeled; all related changes followed. Critics claimed that re-orientation defied the logical order of the building. Concrete floor was replaced with marbles, new heating system was mounted and some key decorative elements of the interior were replaced. In the 1990s the monastery was enlarged by a new wing, hosting the postulate, novitiate and juniorate premises. The change involved also closing of the lower church, which - not unrelated to decreasing religiosity and lower attendance levels - ceased to host public liturgy; until now it generally remains closed to the lay and serves internal Franciscan purposes. The church and the monastery keep hosting various groups and initiatives. During its history there have been around 120 friars serving in the monastery so far. Some of the local friars like Jan Maciejowski became recognized figures in the Polish church and few like Bolesław Mika were engaged in ecclesiastical controversies. The number of friars keeps dropping; in 2018 there were 6 fathers and 2 brothers in the convent.

== Monastery and church: architecture ==
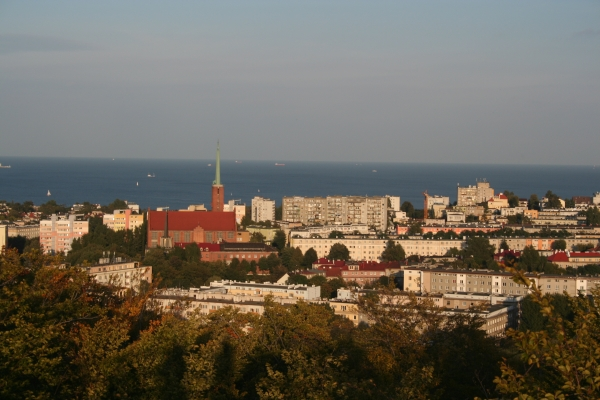
the church and its neighborhood

The monastery building was designed by a young architect Zbigniew Kupiec and his older collaborator Tadeusz Kossak, both since the early 1930s active in Gdynia; at that time Kupiec was already renown for a number of residential buildings along the main city street and prestigious villas in the plushy Kamienna Góra district; in total he designed some 40 buildings in Gdynia of the 1930s. Based on L-shaped layout, the monastery edifice consisted of two symmetrical wings of approximately 35 meters length and 15 meters width each. Built in traditional technology and almost exclusively of bricks, it housed 22 individual cells, refectory, communication and common utility spaces; the adjacent large chapel was based on a 275 square meters floor plan, its main hall 7 meters high and with separate entrances from the monastery and for the public. Deprived of architectural novelties it is usually noted as an example of functionalism.

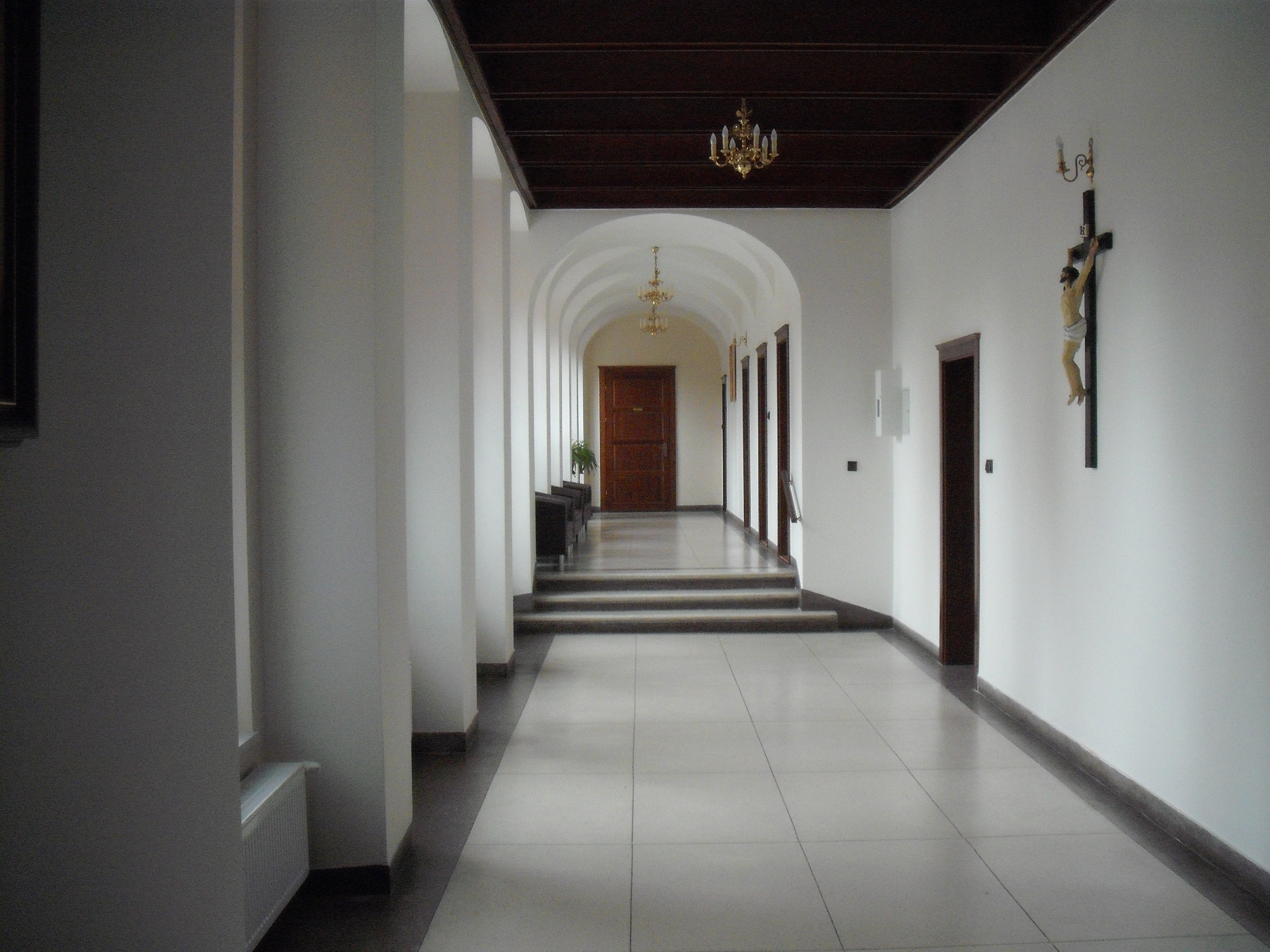
monastery interior

Original design of the church was also prepared by Kupiec and his new collaborator, Zygmunt Gawlik, in the late 1940s. Unlike the down-to-earth monastery building it envisioned a large construction, which located on the hill was intended as a major city landmark. The temple was to be based on rectangular layout some 45 meters long and 25 meters width; the plan featured a hall church with central nave braced by two lower aisles, generously lit with vertically oriented windows running through all height of the walls. The front also emphasized vertical lines, reinforced by a slender, lighthouse-like tower framed in-between the church and the monastery; a two-pitched, gable roof was envisioned. The design was from the onset challenged by the Franciscan authorities, concerned with interior features like glass walls, deemed extravagant. Even when dropped, the project was rejected by municipal authorities with no reason specified.

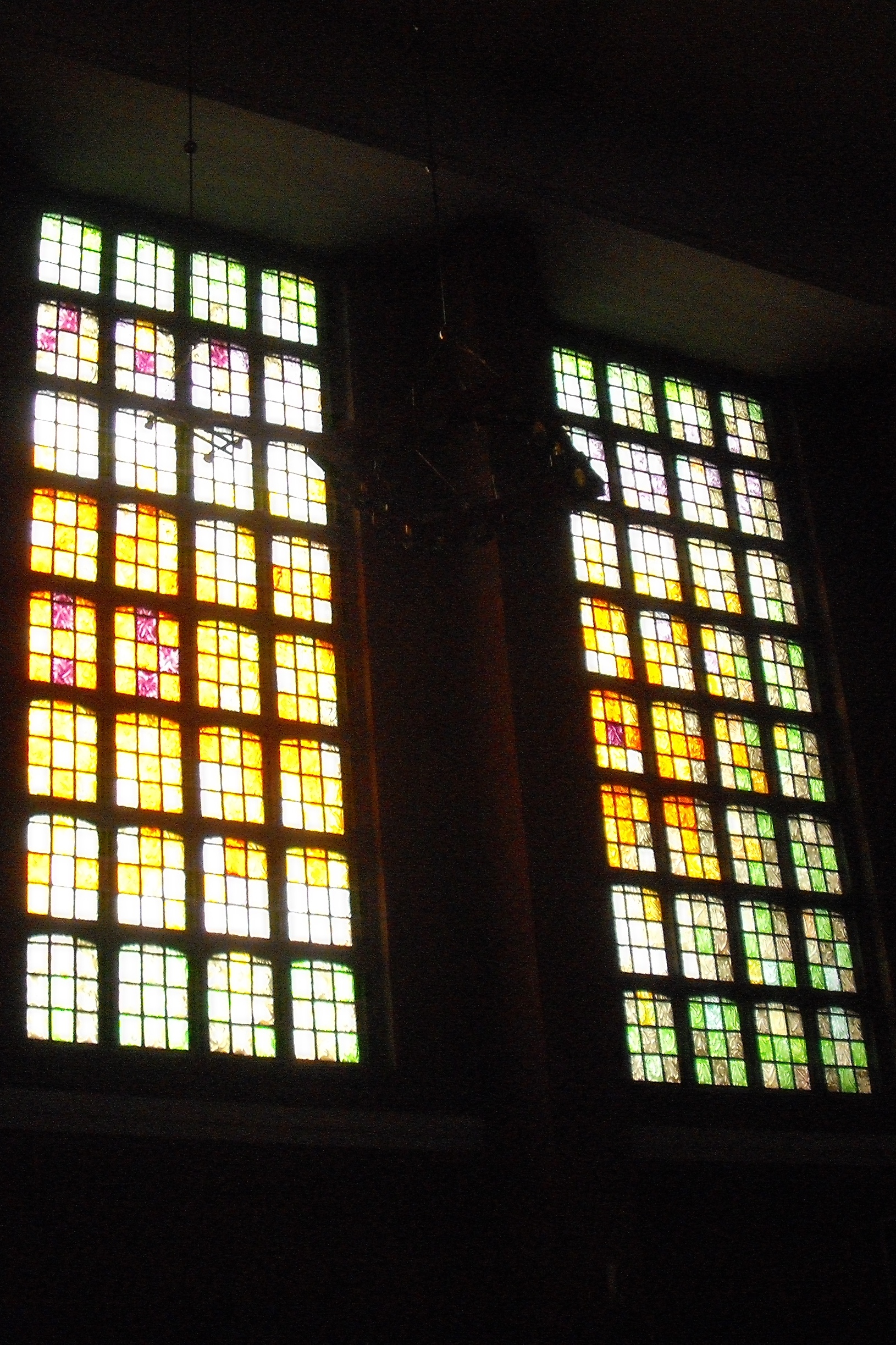
stained glass

A new design, eventually followed and leading to construction of the currently standing building, was worked out hastily in 1956. The hurry resulted from political circumstances; ecclesiastical authorities feared that apparent political thaw might be short-lived and insisted Kupiec produces new plans which might get approved before the communists change their course again. The new plan partially resembled the old one, as it was based on approximately the same layout, featured the same gabled roof, proposed high side windows and emphasized verticality, but it also advanced some major alterations. Central nave with 2 aisles was replaced with a somewhat wider nave with only one, Eastern aisle. It was separated from the central space by massive piers supporting a gallery, a new feature rather unusual in modern Roman Catholic churches. A slender tower was replaced with a larger one, crowned with two high spires; it was removed from in-between the church and the monastery to the South-Eastern corner of the temple. Most importantly, a one-level construction was replaced with two halls, taking advantage of the slope gradient; the lower one, accessible only from the North, was to house educational and social activities but was eventually turned into a church, the upper one, accessible from the North and the South, was to become the main church itself. Construction material was bricks; eventually it took some 1,2m of them to complete the building. Currently the design is noted as containing some Gothic references, though principally related to modernism and simplified cubism. Hurried architectural work is blamed for some deficiencies; upper church suffered from very poor visibility from the aisle, framed by massive piers, and from the gallery. The tower proved to be inappropriate for huge bells mounted, their motion threatening the very construction.

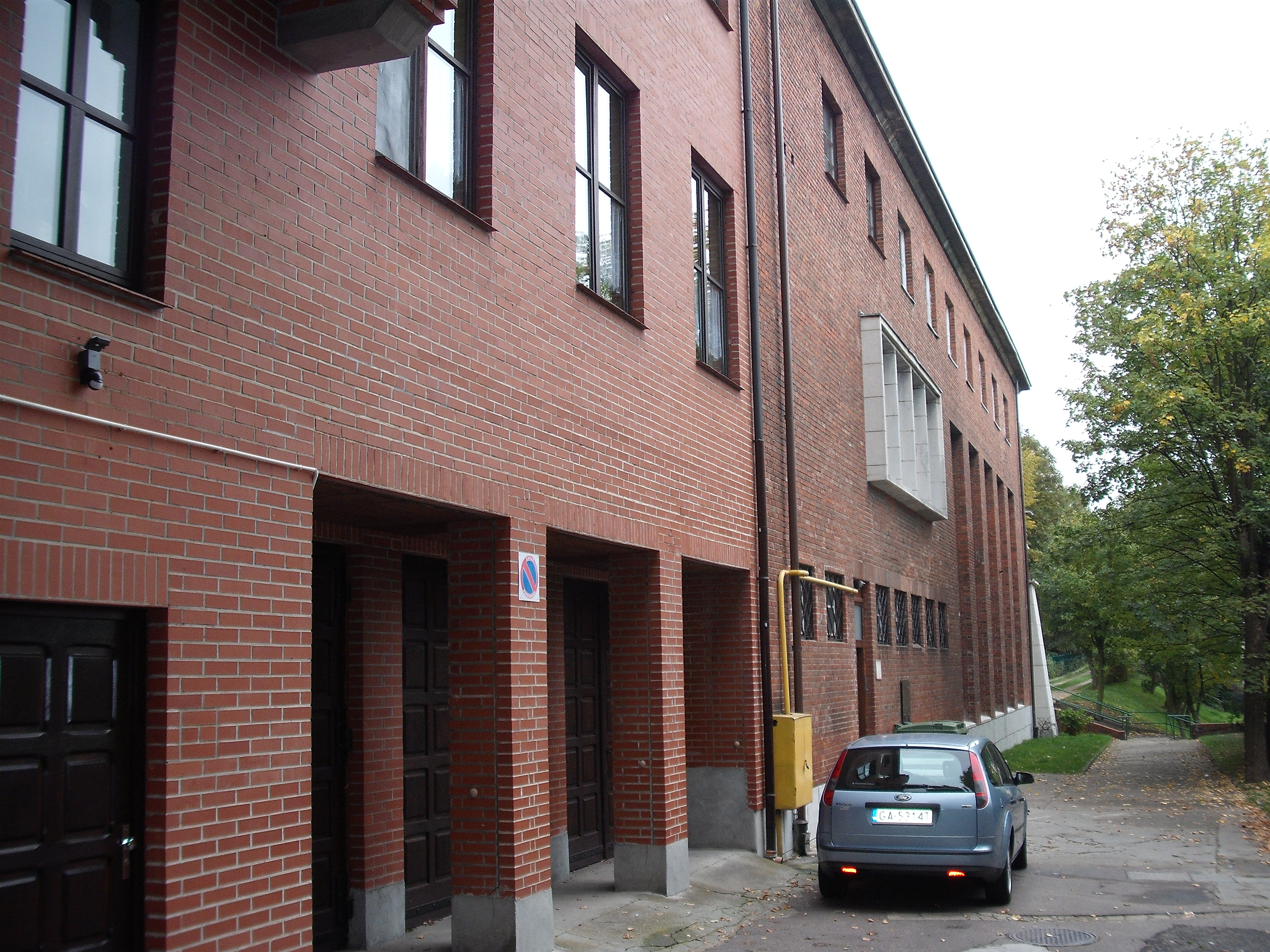
new (left) and old (right) monastery

Interior of the upper church took form in course of decades, shaped by esthetic preferences of the friars. The ambience is hugely determined by stained glass windows; composed of square, non-figurative tiles, they are grouped according to the color key and are supposed to reflect three mysteries of faith: creation, redemption and salvation. For many years the single eye-catching decorative feature was giant painting of Maksymilian Kolbe against the Auschwitz camp background, authored by one of the friars, Teofil Zimnoch. It is now removed from the church and substituted by a much smaller installation; as the single dominating object it was replaced in the 1990s by a giant crucifix designed by Stanisław Radwański, at that time head of the Gdańsk Akademia Sztuk Pięknych; naturalistically presented tortured body provides a counter-reference to the spirited face of crucified Jesus. Another giant object of the interior is painting of Mary as Queen of the Earth, painted in 1961 by Felicissimus Sztyka. Red-brick walls are scarcely decorated, except for the wooden Via Crucis of Stanisław Bąkowski. The chapel of St. Maksymlian, opened in the 1970s, is an example of modern design based on central layout, combining paintings of Mieczysław Kościelniak, stone sculptures of Piotr Żarnowski and metalwork of Józef Fukś and Józef Szczepanik.

== See also ==
- Gdynia
- Franciscan
- Wzgórze Św. Maksymiliana

== Footnotes ==
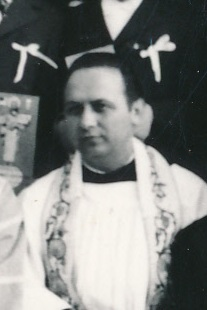
Manswet Wardyn OFMConv (1937–2018)
