= Gdańsk Stocznia railway station =

Railway station in Gdańsk, Poland

Gdańsk Stocznia
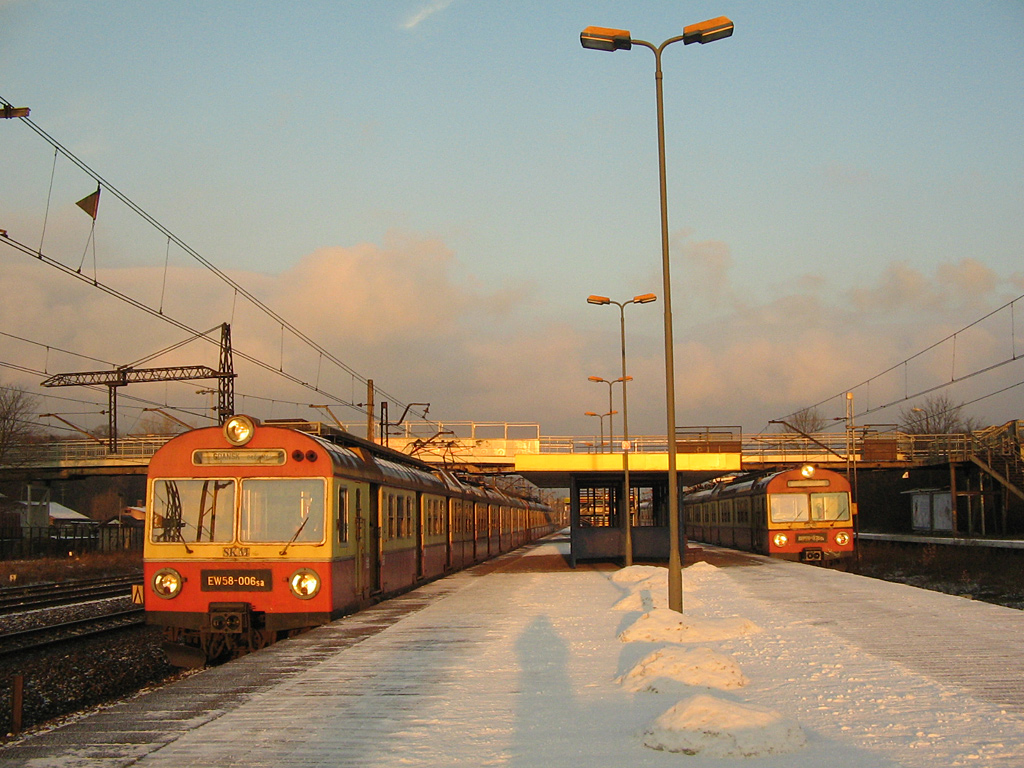

General information
- Location: Gdańsk, Pomeranian Voivodeship; Poland
- System: Railway Station
- Operator: SKM Tricity
- Line: 250: Gdańsk Śródmieście–Rumia railway
- Platforms: 2

History
- Opened: 1867; 159 years ago
- Former names: Danzig Oliver Tor (until 1945)
Location
- Location within Poland

Gdańsk Stocznia railway station is a railway station serving the city of Gdańsk, in the Pomeranian Voivodeship, Poland. The station opened in 1867 and is located on the Gdańsk Śródmieście–Rumia railway. The train services are operated by SKM Tricity.

The station has an island platforms, a third platform existed on the line to Nowy Port, which is now closed. The ticket office used to be located on this platform, but the building has been demolished. An old, nonoperational signal box is located by the tracks serving the line from Gdańsk to Wejherowo.

The station is infamous for the December 1970 Events when scores of shipyard workers who disembarked at the station on the way to work were shot at by Milicja troops along with some military units on the orders of Zenon Kliszko; hundreds were killed or wounded.

== General information ==
Access to platforms is provided by a footbridge from both sides of the railway. On the eastern side the bridge is connected with shipyard gate. An old Gdańsk Brama Oliwska (Oliver Tor) station building is located nearby, this has not been operational for a long time. Gdańsk Stocznia was once a very busy station, as most shipyard employees were using it. Now that the shipyard is merely a shadow of what it used to be, the stop is even omitted by some night connections. Gdańsk Stocznia stop is not connected with other municipal transport lines, except for one tram stop. It does not provide access for any important city areas (except the shipyard).

This stop used to be a common one for Gdańsk-Wejherowo and Gdańsk-Nowy Port lines until June 2005, when the latter line closed. Some freight trains still use this line today.

Standing on a platform, or watching from trains windows one can see the perspective of the Gdańsk Shipyard, with cranes, other devices or even ships. Not until few years ago, some slogans were seen on roofs and walls of shipyards buildings, mainly connected with 1980 events and the times of privatisation of shipyard.

== Gdańsk - Gdańsk Nowy Port line ==
The line connecting Gdańsk Główny (Danzig Hbf.) with Gdańsk Nowy Port (Danzig Neufahrwasser) was opened in October 1867. It was electrified in 1951, but the voltage was changed (from 800 V) into standard 3 kV in 1973. The line served mostly as the transport route for shipyard workers who commuted to the Gdańsk Shipyard. On December 15, 2002, the line was shortened to reach only Gdańsk Brzeźno. On June 25, 2005, the line was completely closed for passenger service.

== Train services ==
The station is served by the following services:

- Szybka Kolej Miejska services (SKM) (Lębork -) Wejherowo - Reda - Rumia - Gdynia - Sopot - Gdansk

Preceding station	SKM Tricity	Following station
Gdańsk Politechnika towards Wejherowo or Lębork	SKM Tricity	Gdańsk Główny towards Gdańsk Śródmieście

== Public transport ==
Gdańsk Stocznia is linked with tram lines No. 2, 6, 8, 11, 12, 13 and 94 as well as with bus lines 108, 118, 121, 151, 154, 174, 181, 205, 207, 208, 209, 213, 232, 254, 256, 295 and 308.
