= Gdańsk Zaspa Towarowa railway station =

Railway station in Gdańsk, Poland

Coordinates: 54.3949°N 18.6409°E

Gdańsk Zaspa Towarowa
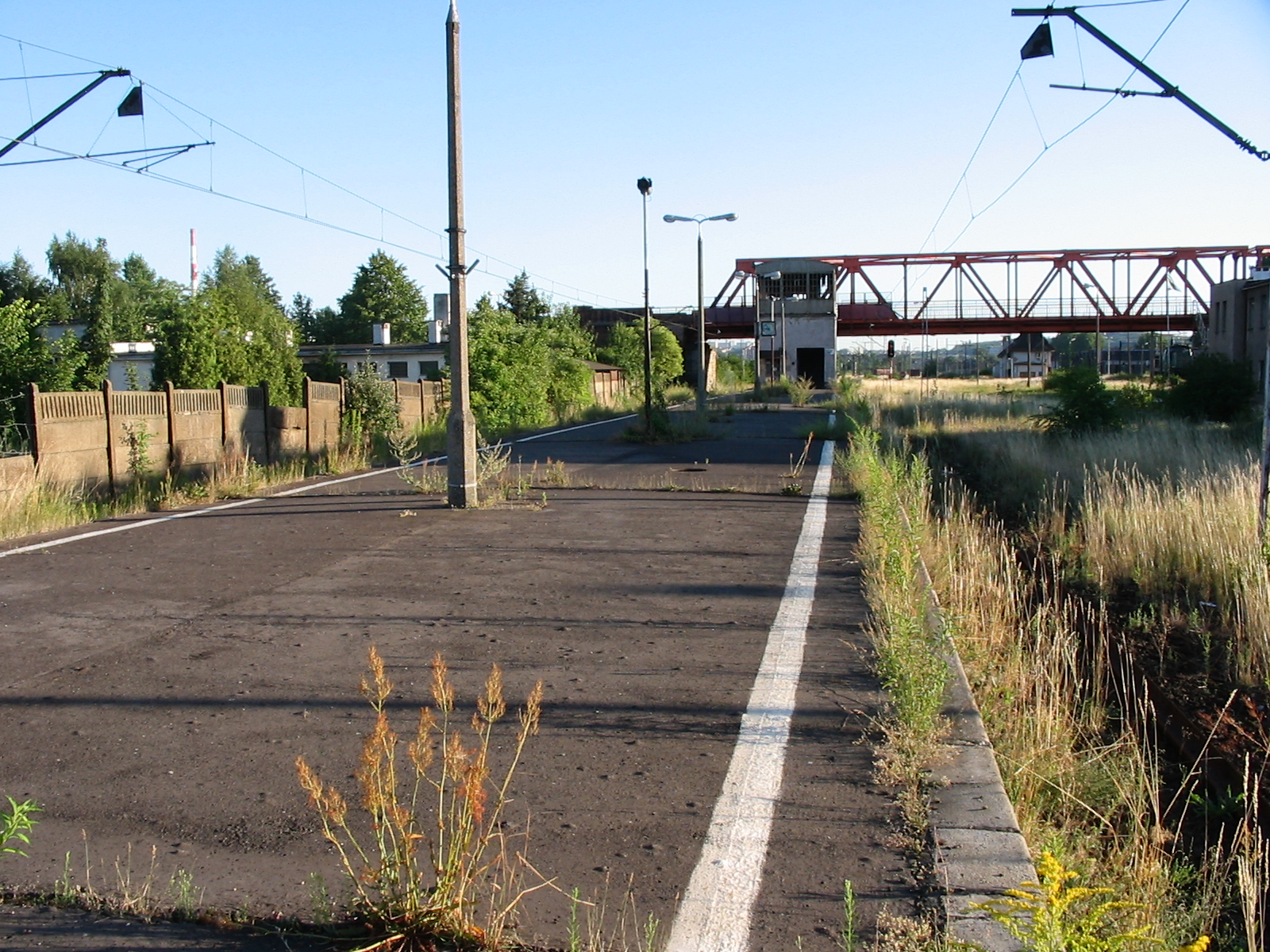

General information
- Location: Gdańsk; Poland
- Operator: SKM (Tricity)
- Line: No passenger service
- Platforms: 1

History
- Opened: 1867
- Closed: 2005
- Former names: Saspe (until 1945)
Location
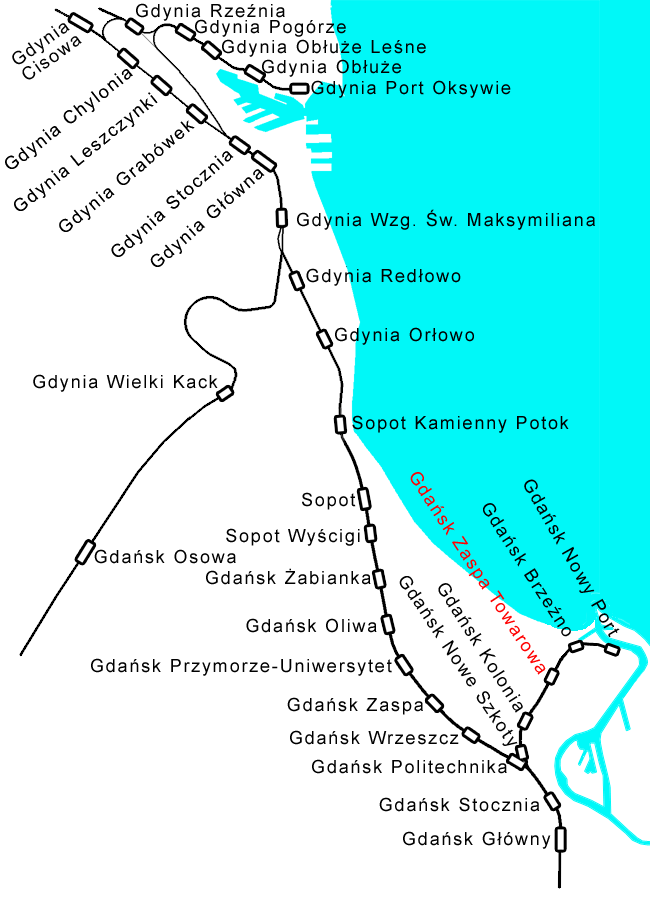

Gdańsk Zaspa Towarowa is a former SKM stop in Gdańsk, Poland. It is no longer used after canceling passenger service on Gdańsk – Nowy Port line in June 2005. This line is now used only for freight transport.

The stop was planned to be reopened by 2012 as it is near to the location of the PGE Arena, which was planned for 2012 UEFA European Football Championship. It was suggested that this stop be renamed for Gdańsk PGE Arena, as the present name is rather illegible for foreign visitors.The remains of the former station was later demolished in 2020.

== The line ==
The line connecting Gdańsk Główny (Danzig Hbf.) with Gdańsk Nowy Port (Danzig Neufahrwasser) was opened in October 1867. It was electrified in 1951, and the voltage was changed (from 800 V) into standard 3 kV in 1973. The line served mostly as the transport route for shipyard workers who commuted to the Gdańsk Shipyard. On 15 December 2002 the line was shortened to reach only Gdańsk Brzeźno. On 25 June 2005 the line was completely closed for passenger service.
