= Gdynia Leszczynki railway station =

Railway station in Gdynia, Poland

Gdynia Leszczynki
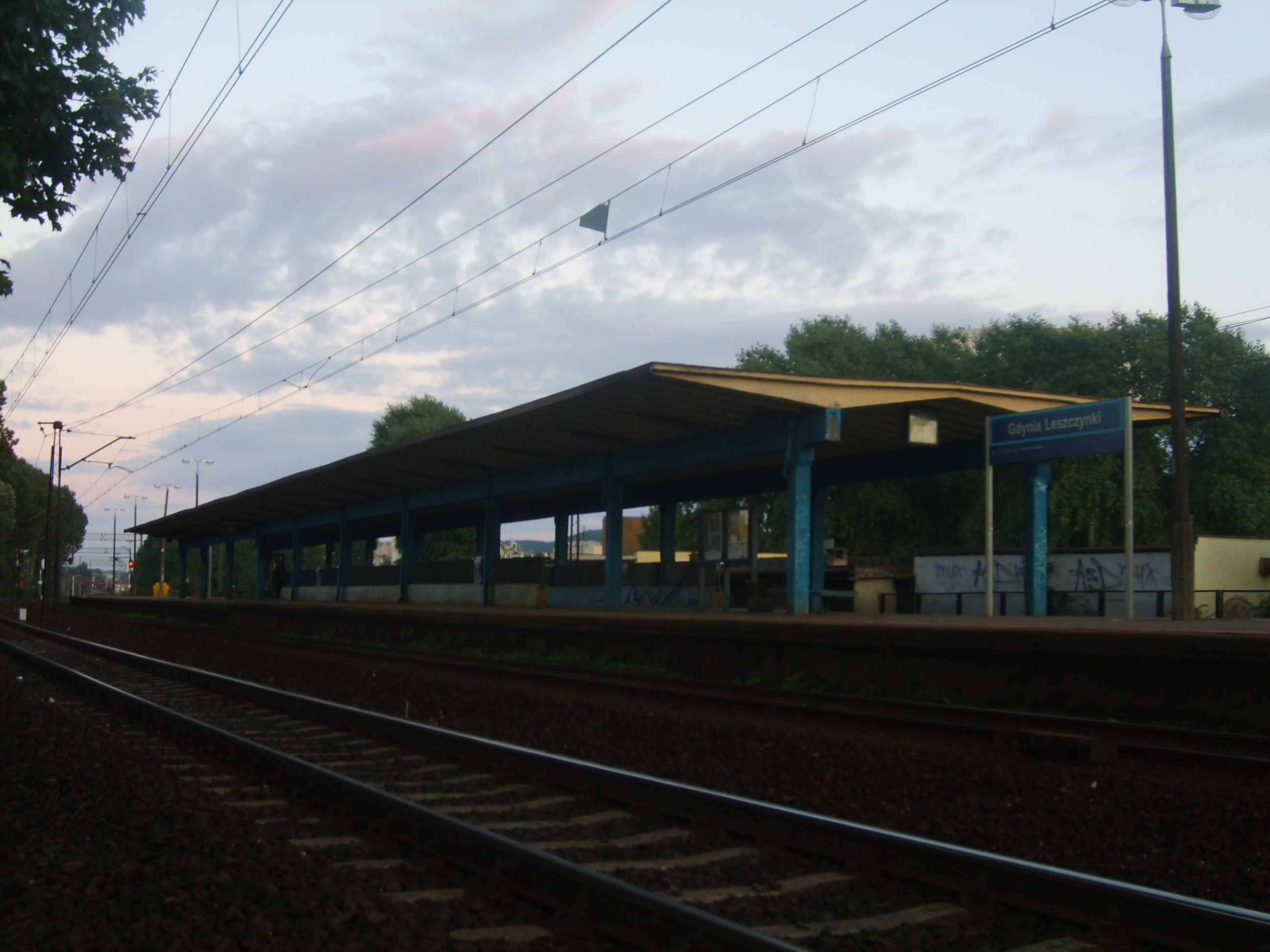
- Gdynia Leszczynki railway station

General information
- Location: Gdynia, Pomeranian Voivodeship; Poland
- System: Railway Station
- Operator: SKM Tricity
- Line: 250: Gdańsk Śródmieście–Rumia railway
- Platforms: 2

History
- Opened: 1951; 75 years ago
- Rebuilt: 2021–2023
Location
- Location within Poland

Gdynia Leszczynki railway station is a railway station serving the city of Gdynia, in the Pomeranian Voivodeship, Poland. The station opened in 1951 and is located on the Gdańsk Śródmieście–Rumia railway. The train services are operated by SKM Tricity Gdynia Leszczynki SKM PKP Gdynia, in the 2021-2023 Gdynia Orłowo railway stationPrzebudowy 2021-2022 Przebudowy 2021-2023 Gdynia Leszczynski Gdynia Główna railway station Gdynia Wzgórze św. Maksymiliana railway station Polregio Gdynia Leszczynski Gdynia Orłowo railway station Przebudowy 2021-2023

== Train services ==
The station is served by the following service(s):

- Szybka Kolej Miejska services (SKM) (Lębork -) Wejherowo - Reda - Rumia - Gdynia - Sopot - Gdansk

Preceding station	SKM Tricity	Following station
Gdynia Chylonia towards Wejherowo or Lębork	SKM Tricity	Gdynia Grabówek towards Gdańsk Śródmieście
