= Redłowo =

District of Gdynia

- District of Gdynia
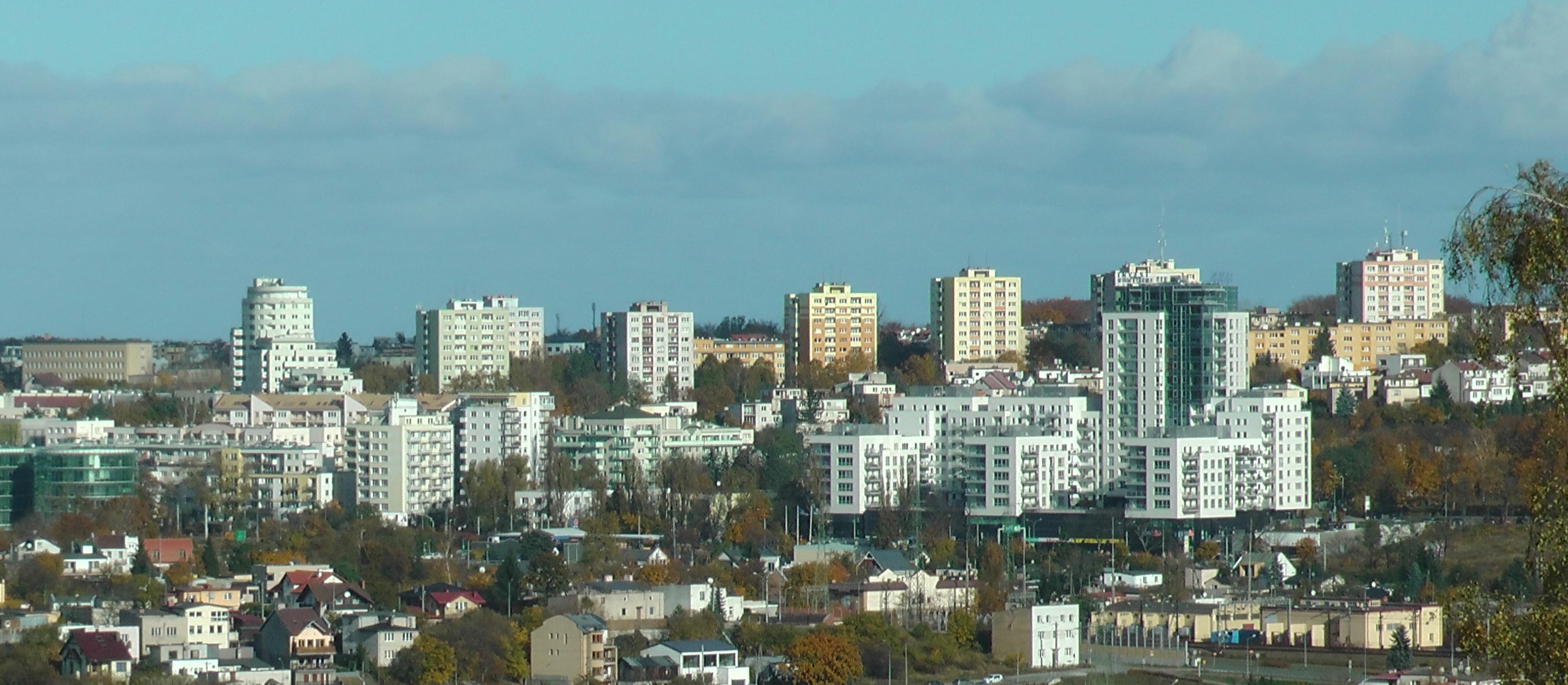

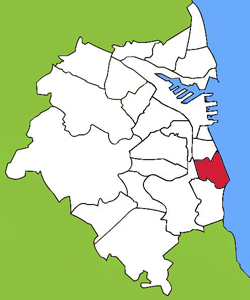
- Location of Redłowo within Gdynia
- Coordinates: 54°49′33″N 18°55′13″E
- Country: Poland
- Voivodeship: Pomeranian
- County/City: Gdynia
- Within city limits: 1935

Area
  - Total: 2.96 km^{2} (1.14 sq mi)

Population (2022)
  - Total: 7,986
  - Density: 2,700/km^{2} (6,990/sq mi)
- Time zone: UTC+1 (CET)
  - Summer (DST): UTC+2 (CEST)
- Vehicle registration: GA

Redłowo is a coastal district of the Polish city of Gdynia. It is 2.96 km^{2} and has a population of 7,986 (as of 2022).

The Pomeranian Science and Technology Park Gdynia is located in Redłowo.

== History ==
Historical population
Year	Pop.
1921	169
2022	7,986

Redłowo has been mentioned as far back as the 12th and 13th centuries under the name Radłowo. It was a royal village of the Kingdom of Poland, administratively located in the Gdańsk County in the Pomeranian Voivodeship. It was recognized as Redłowo in 1888.

During the German occupation of Poland in World War II, in 1939, the occupiers operated a temporary transit camp for expelled Poles in Redłowo.

== Transport ==
The Gdynia Redłowo railway station is located in Redłowo.
