= Gdańsk Nowe Szkoty railway station =

Railway station in Gdańsk, Poland

Coordinates: 54.3736°N 18.6304°E

Gdańsk Nowe Szkoty
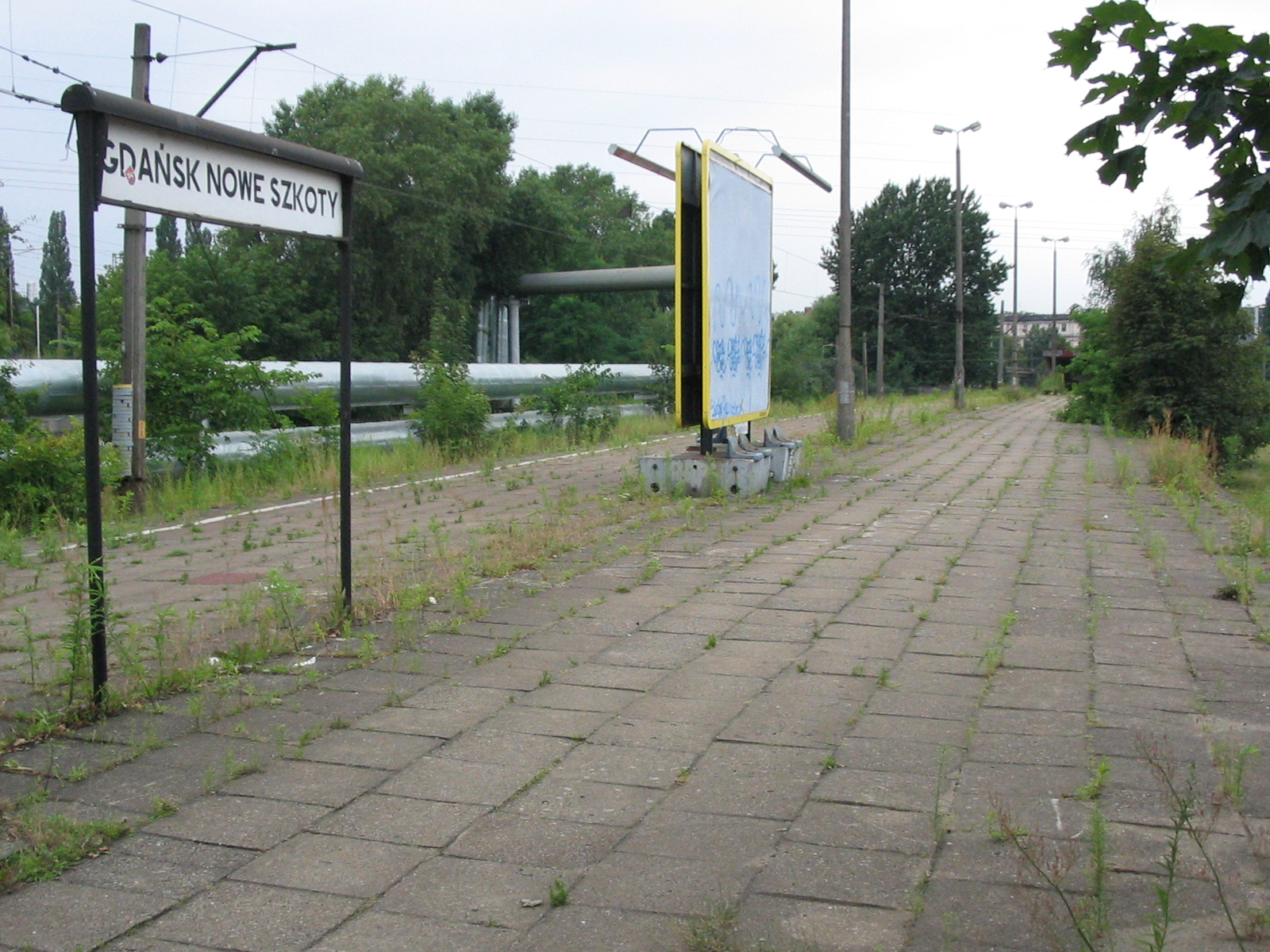

General information
- Location: Nowe Szkoty, Gdańsk; Poland
- Operator: SKM (Tricity)
- Line: No passenger service
- Platforms: 1

History
- Opened: 1867
- Closed: 2005
- Former names: Danzig Neuschottland (until 1945)
Location
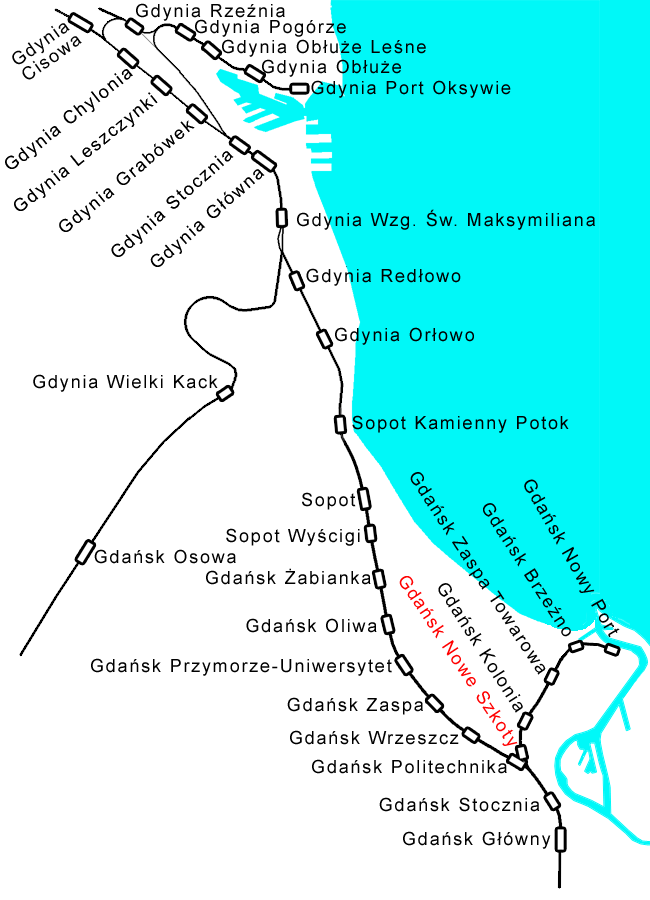

Gdańsk Nowe Szkoty is a former SKM stop in the quarter of Nowe Szkoty in Gdańsk, Poland. It is no longer used since June 2005, after canceling passenger service on the Gdańsk–Nowy Port line.

This line is now used only for freight transport. However, the halt was re-opened for a short time in November 2006 due to the renovation of the preceding SKM stop.

== General information ==
The stop is connected with Gdańsk Politechnika stop. The platforms were almost parallel and it took few seconds to move from one to another. Right now the platform and former ticket office is devastated and its condition is getting worse every day. In 2020 the former station platforms were demolished leaving the former station building as the remaining part of the station.

== The line ==
The line connecting Gdańsk Główny (Danzig Hbf.) with Gdańsk Nowy Port (Danzig Neufahrwasser) was opened in October 1867. It had been electrified in 1951, but the voltage was changed (from 800 V) into standard 3 kV in 1973. The line served mostly as the transport route for shipyard workers who commuted to the Gdańsk Shipyard. On December 15, 2002, the line was shortened to reach only Gdańsk Brzeźno. On June 25, 2005, the line was completely closed for passenger service.
