= Gdańsk Politechnika railway station =

Railway station in Gdańsk, Poland

Gdańsk Politechnika
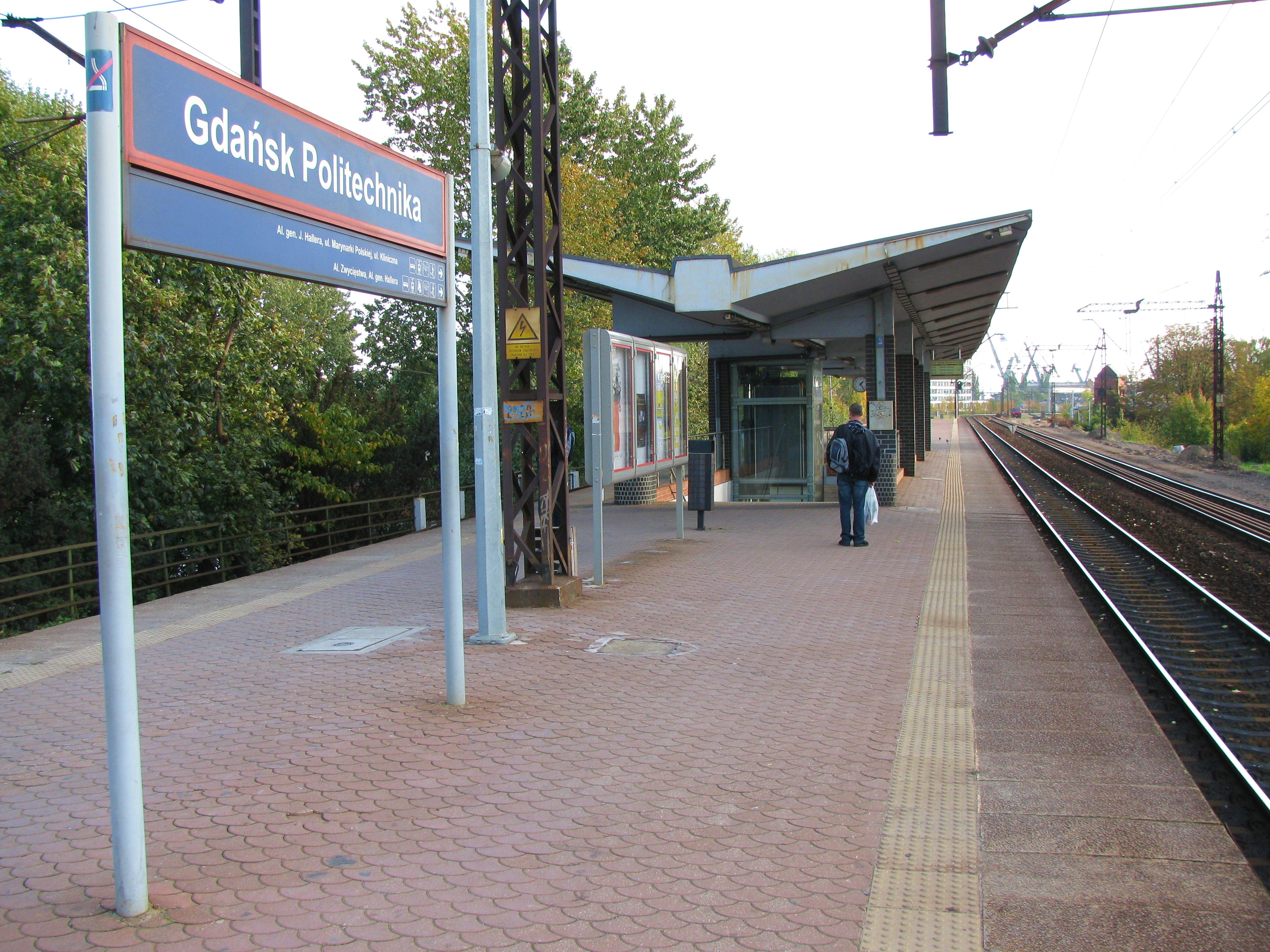

General information
- Location: Gdańsk, Pomeranian Voivodeship; Poland
- System: Railway Station
- Operator: SKM Tricity
- Line: 250: Gdańsk Śródmieście–Rumia railway
- Platforms: 2
- Tracks: 4

History
- Opened: 1952; 74 years ago
- Former names: Gdańsk Nowa Szkocja (until 1960s)
Location
- Location within Poland

Gdańsk Politechnika railway station is a railway station serving the city of Gdańsk, in the Pomeranian Voivodeship, Poland. The station opened in 1952 and is located on the Gdańsk Śródmieście–Rumia railway. The train services are operated by SKM Tricity.

Its name is derived from Gdańsk University of Technology (Polish: Politechnika Gdańska) which is nearby. The station was known as Gdańsk Nowa Szkocja (English: Gdańsk Nova Scotia) until the 1960s.

Gdańsk Politechnika is connected with Gdańsk Nowe Szkoty, which was on the route to Gdańsk Nowy Port. This line has been closed to passenger services since June 2005.

== Train services ==
The station is served by the following services:

- Szybka Kolej Miejska services (SKM) (Lębork -) Wejherowo - Reda - Rumia - Gdynia - Sopot - Gdansk

| Preceding station | SKM Tricity | Following station |
|---|---|---|
| Gdańsk Wrzeszcz towards Wejherowo or Lębork | SKM Tricity | Gdańsk Stocznia towards Gdańsk Śródmieście |
