= Gdańsk Kolonia railway station =

Railway station in Gdańsk, Poland

Coordinates: 54.385°N 18.630°E

Gdańsk Kolonia
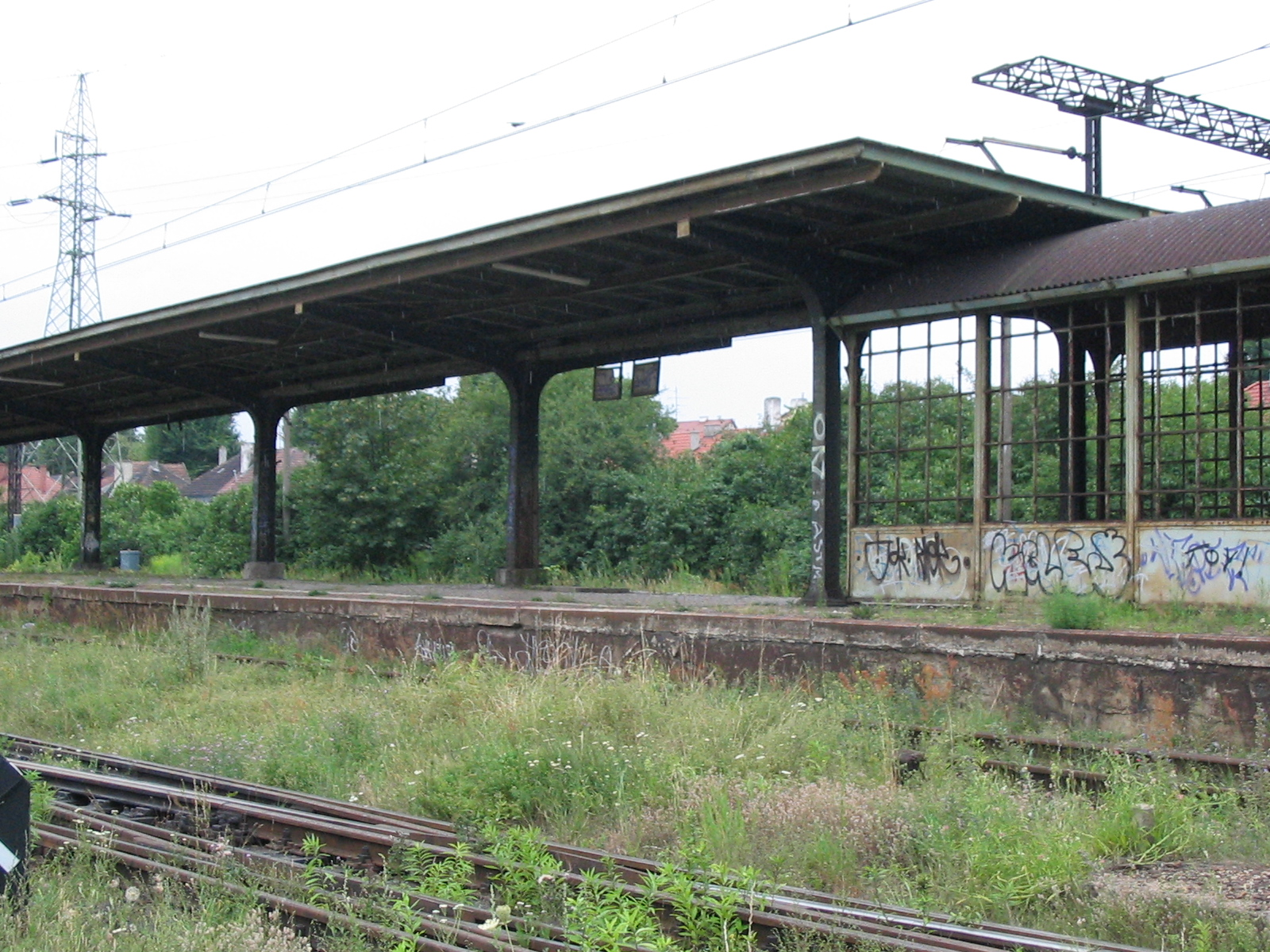

General information
- Location: Gdańsk; Poland
- Operator: SKM (Tricity)
- Line: No passenger service
- Platforms: 1

History
- Opened: 1867
- Closed: 2005
Location
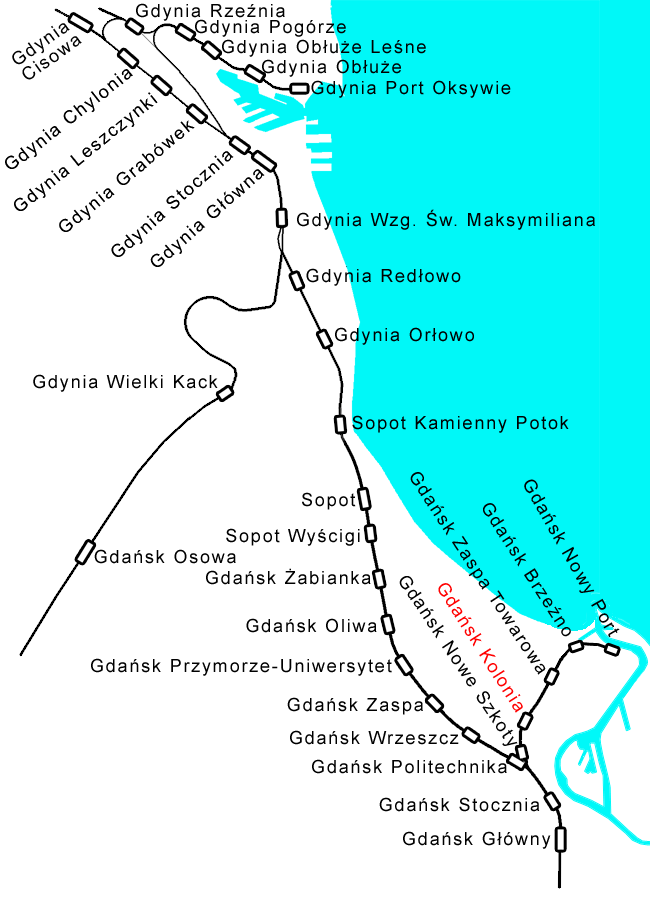

Gdańsk Kolonia is a former SKM stop in Gdańsk, Poland. It is no longer used since June 2005, after canceling passenger service on Gdańsk - Nowy Port line. This line is now used for freight transport, except sport events. On June 25, 2005, the station was definitely closed for passenger service.

== The line ==
The line connecting Gdańsk Główny (Danzig Hbf.) with Gdańsk Nowy Port (Danzig Neufahrwasser) was opened in October 1867. It had been electrified in 1951, but the voltage was changed (from 800 V) into standard 3 kV in 1973. The line served mostly as the transport route for shipyard workers who commuted to the Gdańsk Shipyard. On December 15, 2002, the line was shortened to reach only Gdańsk Brzeźno. The line is re-opened for passenger service during sport events in the PGE Arena.
