= Gdynia Stocznia – Uniwersytet Morski railway station =

Railway station in Gdynia, Poland

Coordinates: 54.5255°N 18.5193°E

Gdynia Stocznia – Uniwersytet Morski
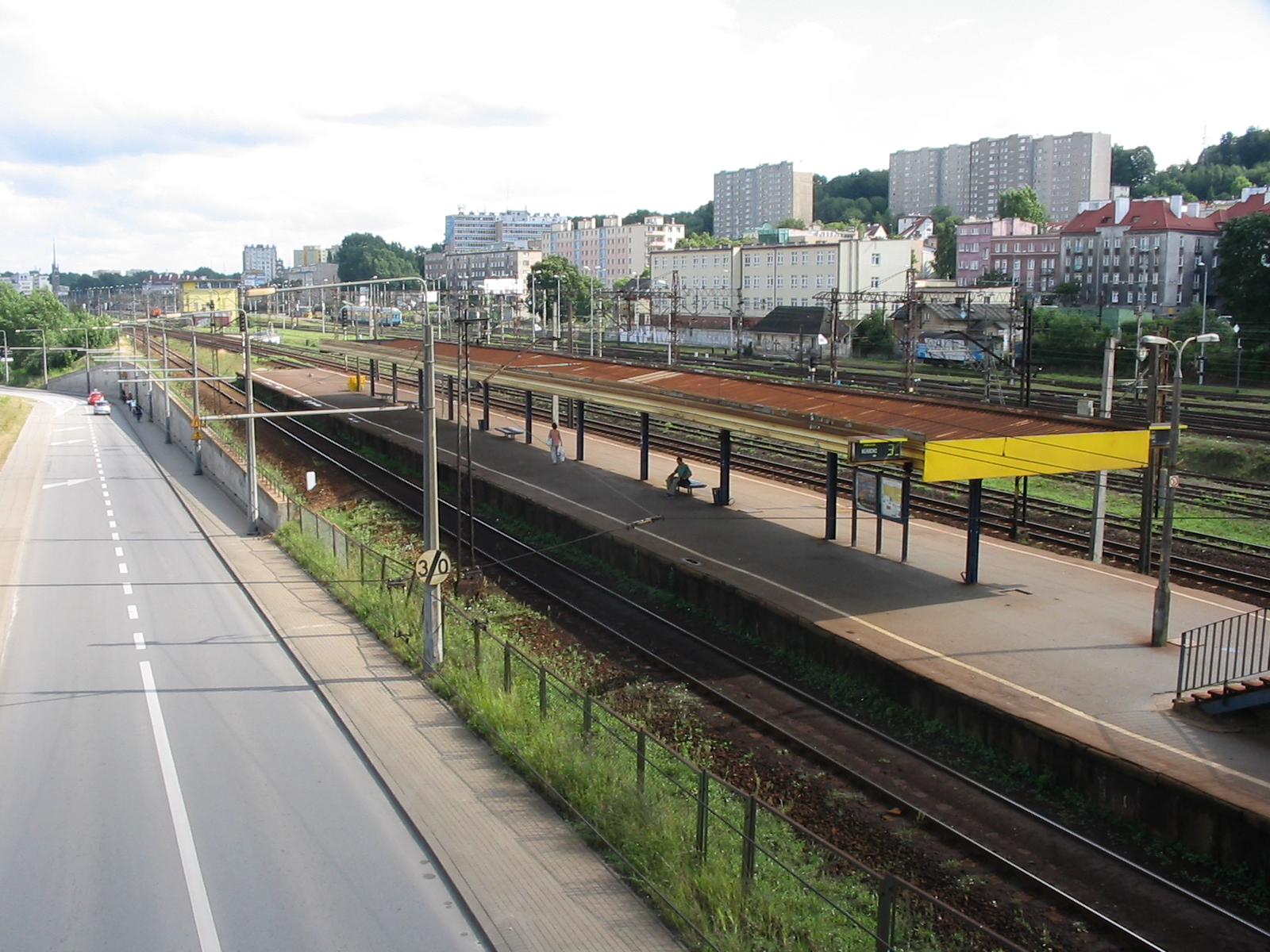

General information
- Location: Gdynia, Pomeranian Voivodeship; Poland
- System: Railway Station
- Operator: SKM Tricity
- Line: 250: Gdańsk Śródmieście–Rumia railway
- Platforms: 2

History
- Opened: 1951; 75 years ago
- Former names: Gdynia Stocznia (1951–2020)

Passengers
- 6,000–8,000 per day (2022)
Location
- Location within Poland

Gdynia Stocznia – Uniwersytet Morski railway station is a railway station serving the city of Gdynia, in the Pomeranian Voivodeship, Poland. The station opened in 1951 and is located on the Gdańsk Śródmieście–Rumia railway. The train services are operated by SKM Tricity.

In December 1970, a vicious riot took place at this stop and in the area between shipyard workers and communist militia and some people, notably Zbyszek Godlewski, were killed.

The name of the stop (Stocznia: shipyard in English) is connected with the nearby Shipyard of Gdynia, and it was used primarily by its workers until its closure in 2009. The Gdynia Maritime University (Uniwersytet Morski w Gdyni), after which the station was partially renamed in June 2020 for its 100th anniversary, is also located within walking distance of this station.

== Train services ==
The station is served by the following services:

- Szybka Kolej Miejska services (SKM) (Lębork -) Wejherowo - Reda - Rumia - Gdynia - Sopot - Gdansk

Preceding station	SKM Tricity	Following station
Gdynia Grabówek towards Wejherowo or Lębork	SKM Tricity	Gdynia Główna towards Gdańsk Śródmieście
