= Wejherowo Nanice railway station =

Railway station in Wejherowo, Poland

Wejherowo Nanice
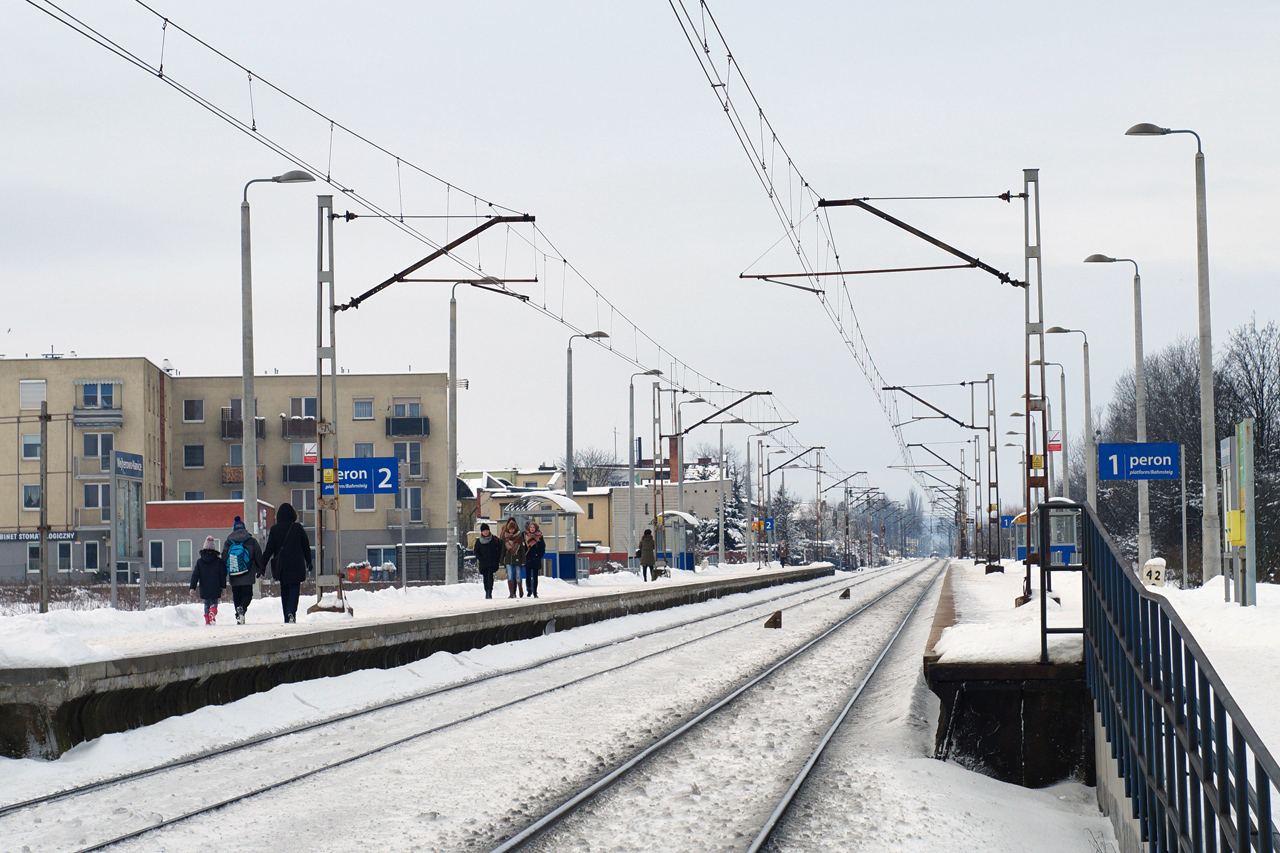
- Wejherowo Nanice railway station

General information
- Location: Wejherowo, Pomeranian Voivodeship; Poland
- System: Railway Station
- Operator: PKP Polskie Linie Kolejowe
- Line: 202: Gdańsk–Stargard railway
- Platforms: 2
- Tracks: 2
Location
- Location within Poland

Wejherowo Nanice railway station is a railway station serving the town of Wejherowo, in the Pomeranian Voivodeship, Poland. The station opened in 1951 and is located on the Gdańsk–Stargard railway. The train services are operated by SKM Tricity.

== Train services ==
The station is served by the following service(s):

- Szybka Kolej Miejska services (SKM) (Lębork -) Wejherowo - Reda - Rumia - Gdynia - Sopot - Gdansk

Preceding station	SKM Tricity	Following station
Wejherowo towards Wejherowo or Lębork	SKM Tricity	Wejherowo Śmiechowo towards Gdańsk Śródmieście
