= Gdańsk Brzeźno railway station =

Railway station in Gdańsk, Poland

Coordinates: 54°24′19.82″N 18°39′22.67″E

Gdańsk Brzeźno
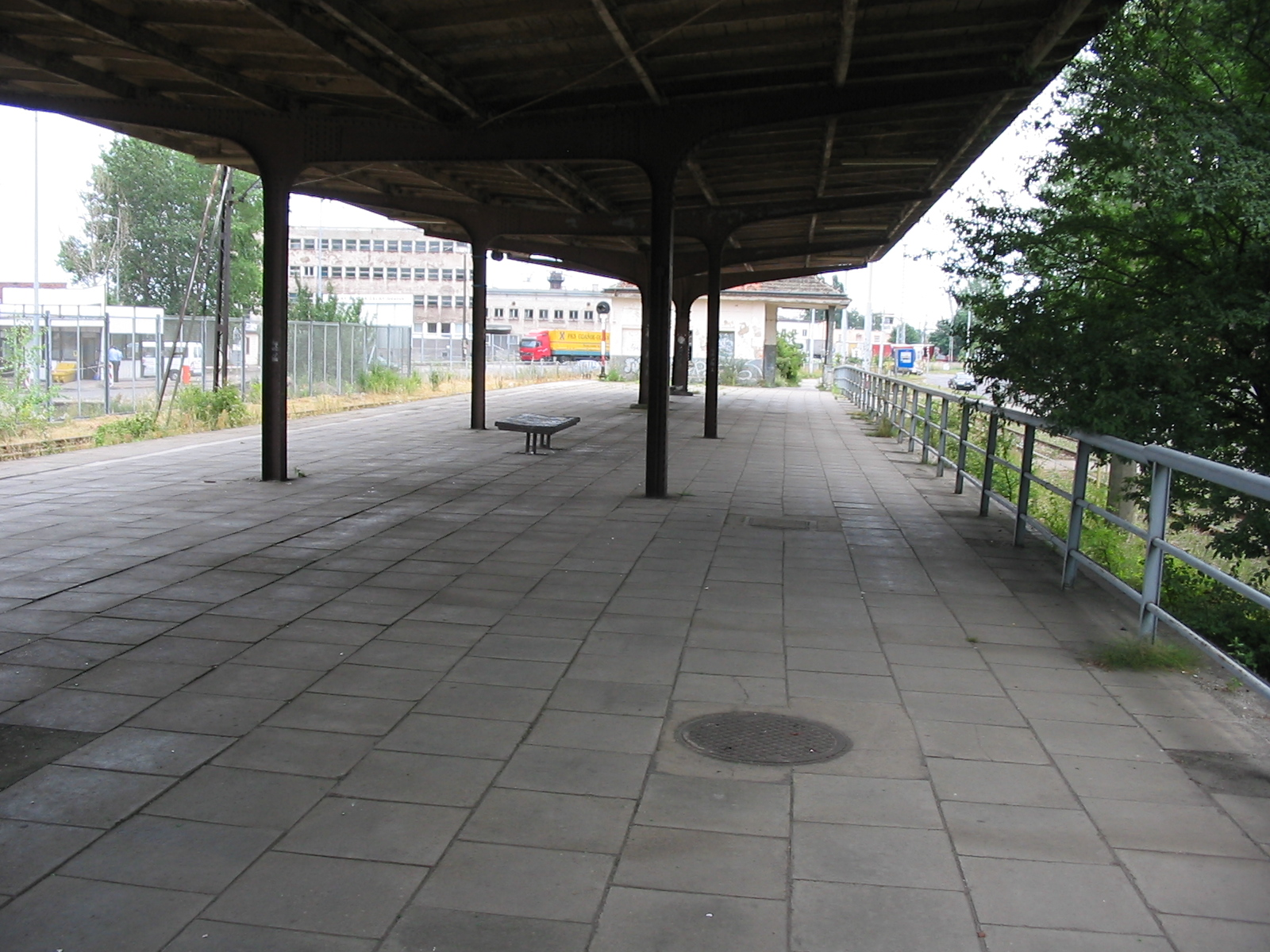

General information
- Location: Gdańsk; Poland
- Operator: SKM (Tricity)
- Line: No passenger service
- Platforms: 1

History
- Opened: 1867
- Closed: 2005
- Former names: Brösen (until 1945)
Location
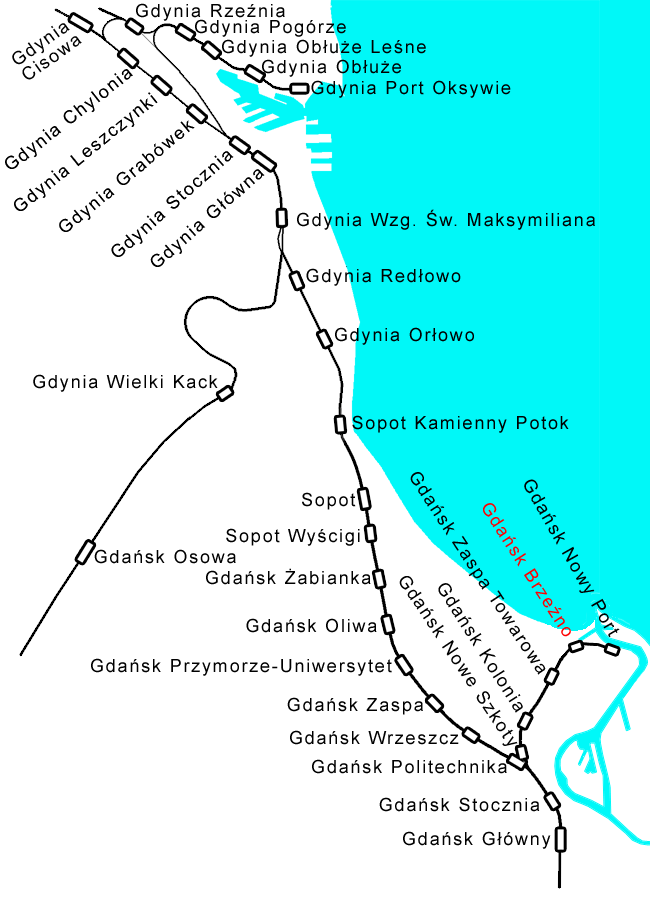

Gdańsk Brzeźno is a former SKM stop in Gdańsk, Poland. It is no longer used since June 2005, after canceling passenger service on Gdańsk - Nowy Port line. This line is now used only for freight transport.

There is plan to include the stop in the planned new Metropolitan Tricity Train line to be ready for 2012 UEFA European Football Championship. But as of April 2025 the station remains unused.

== The line ==
The line connecting Gdańsk Główny (Danzig Hbf.) with Gdańsk Nowy Port (Danzig Neufahrwasser) was opened in October 1867. It had been electrified in 1951, but the voltage was changed (from 800 volts) into standard 3 kV in 1973. The line served mostly as the transport route for shipyard workers who commuted to the Gdańsk Shipyard. On December 15, 2002, the line was shortened to reach only Gdańsk Brzeźno. On June 25, 2005, the line was completely closed for passenger service.
