= Gdynia Grabówek railway station =

Railway station in Gdynia, Poland

Gdynia Grabówek

General information
- Location: Gdynia, Pomeranian Voivodeship; Poland
- System: Railway Station
- Operator: SKM Tricity
- Line: 250: Gdańsk Śródmieście–Rumia railway
- Platforms: 2

History
- Opened: 1951; 75 years ago
Location
- Location within Poland

Gdynia Grabówek railway station is a railway station serving the city of Gdynia, in the Pomeranian Voivodeship, Poland. The station opened in 1951 and is located on the Gdańsk Śródmieście–Rumia railway. The train services are operated by SKM Tricity.

== Train services ==
The station is served by the following service(s):

- Szybka Kolej Miejska services (SKM) (Lębork -) Wejherowo - Reda - Rumia - Gdynia - Sopot - Gdansk

Preceding station	SKM Tricity	Following station
Gdynia Leszczynki towards Wejherowo or Lębork	SKM Tricity	Gdynia Stocznia towards Gdańsk Śródmieście
