= Gdynia Redłowo railway station =

Railway station in Gdynia, Poland

Gdynia Redłowo
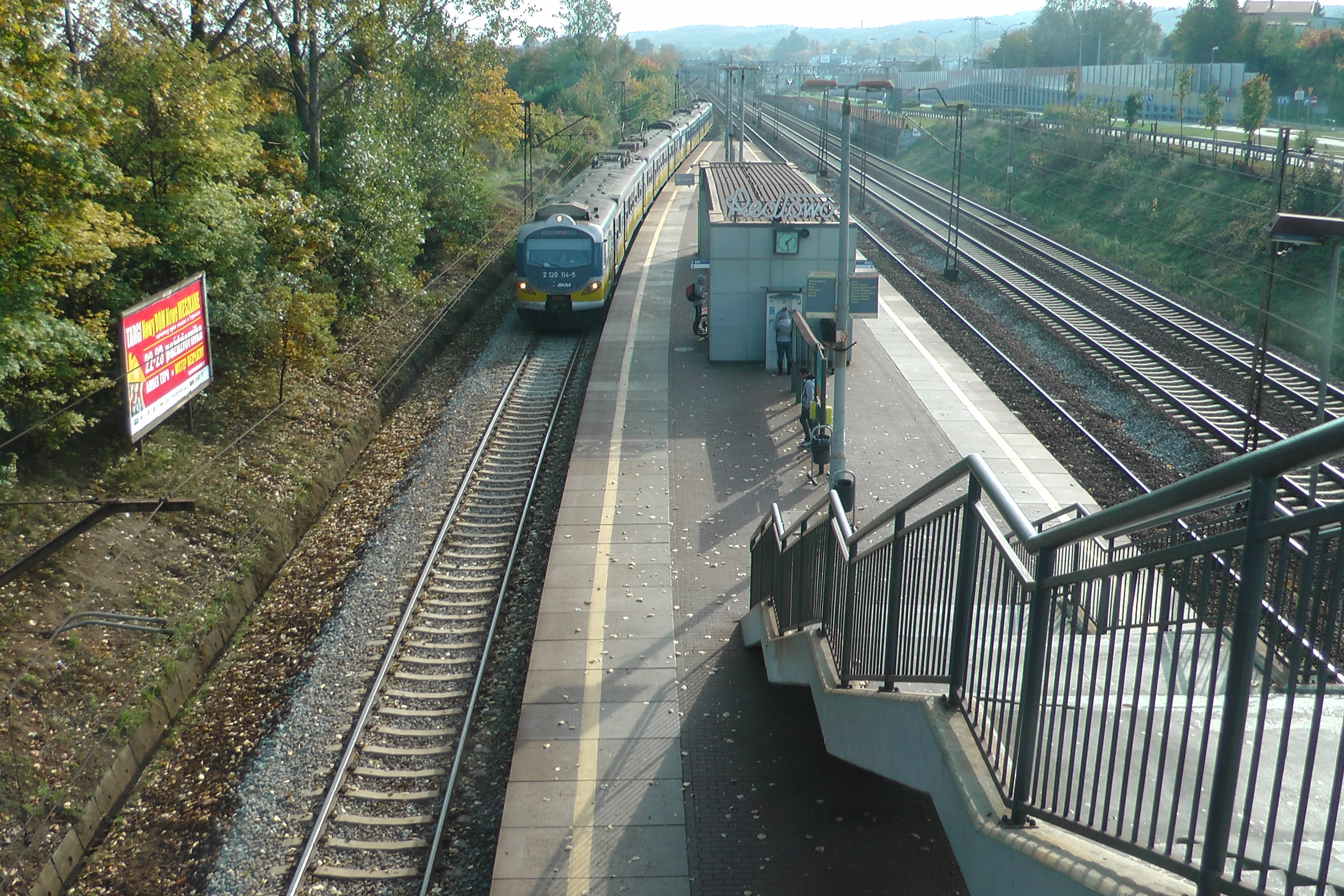
- Gdynia Redłowo railway station

General information
- Location: Gdynia, Pomeranian Voivodeship; Poland
- System: Railway Station
- Operator: SKM Tricity
- Line: 250: Gdańsk Śródmieście–Rumia railway
- Platforms: 2
- Tracks: 4
Location
- Location within Poland

Gdynia Redłowo railway station is a railway station serving the city of Gdynia, in the Pomeranian Voivodeship, Poland. The station is located on the Gdańsk Śródmieście–Rumia railway. The train services are operated by SKM Tricity.

== Train services ==
The station is served by the following service(s):

- Szybka Kolej Miejska services (SKM) (Lębork -) Wejherowo - Reda - Rumia - Gdynia - Sopot - Gdansk

Preceding station	SKM Tricity	Following station
Gdynia Wzgórze św. Maksymiliana towards Wejherowo or Lębork	SKM Tricity	Gdynia Orłowo towards Gdańsk Śródmieście

== Bus services ==
The station is an interchange to buses and trolleybuses to districts such as Wielki Kack, Karwiny, Dąbrowa, Witomino-Leśniczówka and Witomino-Radiostacja.
