= Gdynia Wzgórze Św. Maksymiliana railway station =

Railway station in Gdynia, Poland

Coordinates: 54.5076°N 18.5355°E

Gdynia Wzgórze Św. Maksymiliana
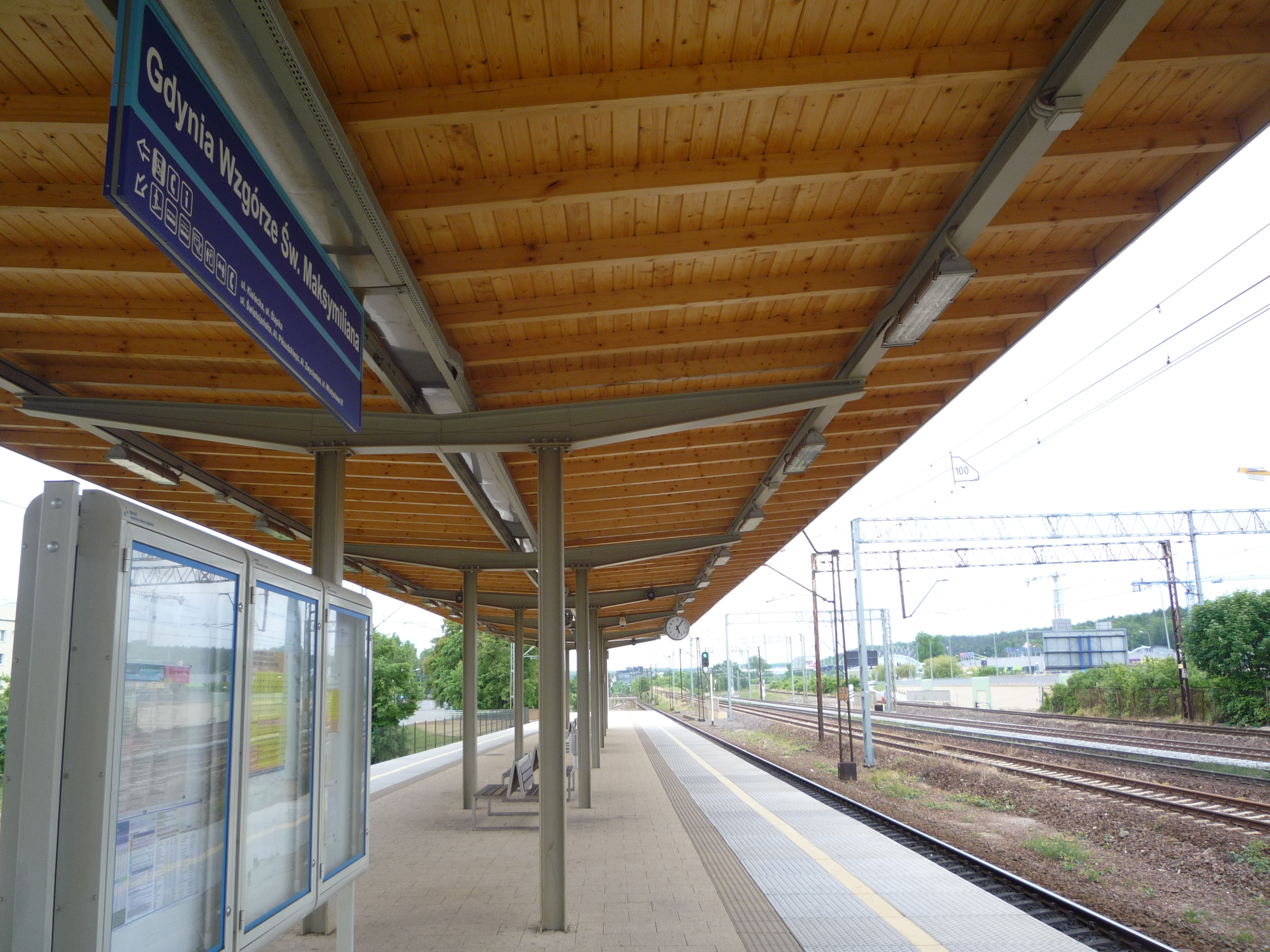
- Gdynia Wzgórze św. Maksymiliana railway station

General information
- Location: Gdynia, Pomeranian Voivodeship; Poland
- System: Railway Station
- Operator: SKM Tricity
- Line: 250: Gdańsk Śródmieście–Rumia railway
- Platforms: 2

History
- Opened: 22 July 1953; 73 years ago
- Rebuilt: 2011
Location
- Location within Poland

Gdynia Wzgórze Św. Maksymiliana railway station is a railway station serving the Wzgórze Św. Maksymiliana neighbourhood of the city of Gdynia, in the Pomeranian Voivodeship, Poland. The station opened in 1953 and is located on the Gdańsk Śródmieście–Rumia railway. The train services are operated by SKM Tricity.

== Modernisation ==
In 2011 the station was modernised making use of EU funds to renew the platforms, information systems, waiting areas, introduce a lift and improve the tunnel.

== Train services ==
The station is served by the following service(s):

- Szybka Kolej Miejska services (SKM) (Lębork -) Wejherowo - Reda - Rumia - Gdynia - Sopot - Gdansk

| Preceding station | SKM Tricity | Following station |
|---|---|---|
| Gdynia Główna towards Wejherowo or Lębork | SKM Tricity | Gdynia Redłowo towards Gdańsk Śródmieście |
