= Gdańsk Nowy Port railway station =

Railway station in Gdańsk, Poland

Coordinates: 54.4035°N 18.6653°E

Gdańsk Nowy Port
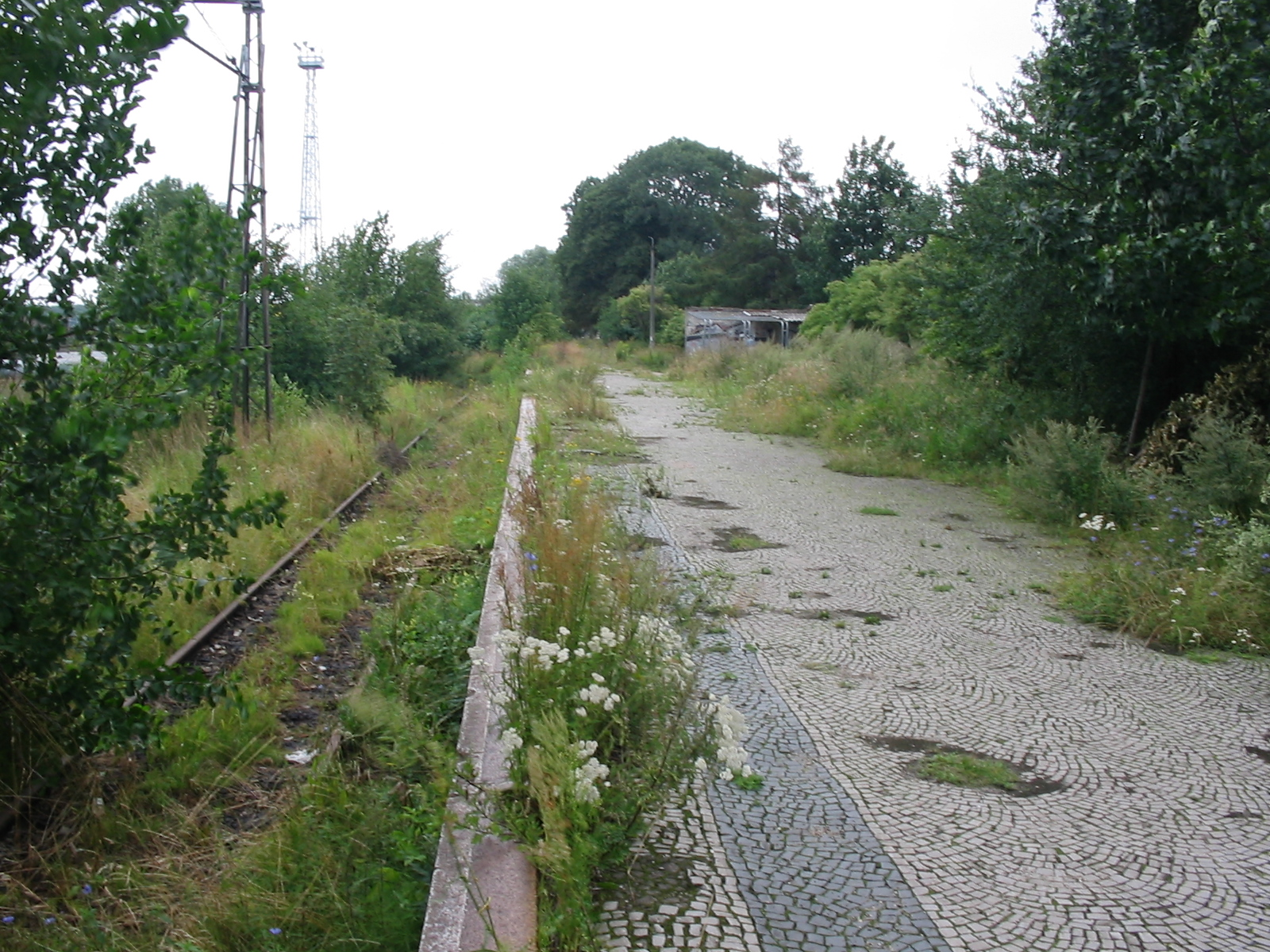

General information
- Location: Gdańsk; Poland
- Operator: SKM (Tricity)
- Line: No passenger service
- Platforms: 1

History
- Opened: 1867
- Closed: 2002
- Former names: Danzig Neufahrwasser (until 1945)
Location
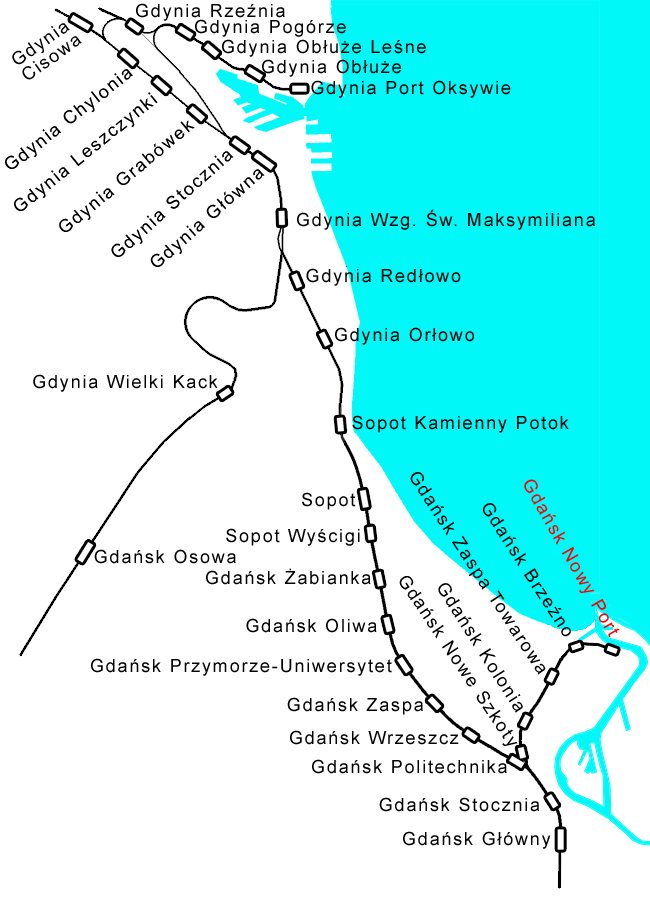

Gdańsk Nowy Port is a former SKM stop in Gdańsk, Poland. It has not been used since 15 December 2002, after truncation of the Gdańsk–Nowy Port line to Brzeźno. Despite plans to re-open the line it is very unlikely that this stop would be restored, as access to it has been impossible since November 2005. Since then the station has gone into a very terrible state, the platforms has been covered by vegetation and the station entrance has been demolished, leaving only some steps that used to go to the former station entrance.

== The line ==
The line connecting Gdańsk Główny (Danzig Hbf.) with Gdańsk Nowy Port (Danzig Neufahrwasser) was opened in October 1867. It had been electrified in 1951, and the voltage was changed (from 800 V) into standard 3 kV in 1973. The line served mostly as the transport route for dockers who commuted to the Port of Gdańsk.

Over the years the line was losing its passengers to the tram communication. In the last years of operation the train was going once an hour (compared to a tram once a 10 minutes) and tram stops were placed in more convenient places. On 15 December 2002 the line was shortened to reach only Gdańsk Brzeźno. On 25 June 2005 the line was definitely closed for passenger service. In 2007 a track between Gdańsk Brzeźno and Gdańsk Nowy Port was completely dismantled during street rebuilding works, making future restoration unlikely.
