= Józef Weyssenhoff =

Polish writer, literary critic and publisher (1960-1932)

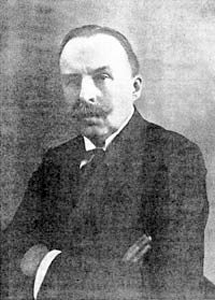
- Weyssenhoff in the late 1910s
- Born: 8 April 1860; Kolano, Russian Empire
- Died: 6 July 1932 (aged 72); Warsaw, Poland
- Resting place: Powązki Cemetery, Warsaw
- Occupations: Novelist, poet, critic, publisher
- Awards

Józef Weyssenhoff (8 April 1860 – 6 July 1932) was a Polish novelist, poet, literary critic, publisher. Close to the National Democracy political movement after 1905, he paid tribute to the tradition of the Polish landed gentry in the Eastern Borderlands. He lived several years in Bydgoszcz in the 1920s.

== Biography ==
=== Early years ===
Weyssenhoff was born on 8 April 1860, in the family estate of Kolano in Podlasie. His ancestors came from Samogitia, today's Latvia, but at the time located in the Russian Empire. They were a well-polonized clan with roots from the 14th century, known as Weyss also knowh as Weyssenhoff. His father, Michał Jerzy Weyssenhoff, died prematurely, in 1866 aged 38. He was leaving to his widow, Wanda Weyssenhoff née Łubieńska, the burden of raising children and running the estate.

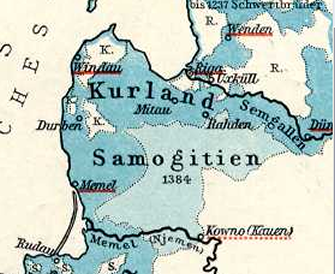
Map of Samogitia in the 14th century

He spent his childhood between Vilnius and Samogitia, then moved to Warsaw to follow gymnasium.

He followed law studies between 1879 and 1884 at the University of Tartu in Kreis Dorpat, Governorate of Livonia of the Russian Empire. During this period, he became a member of the Polish student corporation Konwent Polonia (Polish: Korporacja Akademicka Konwent Polonia), established in 1828 in the very presmises.

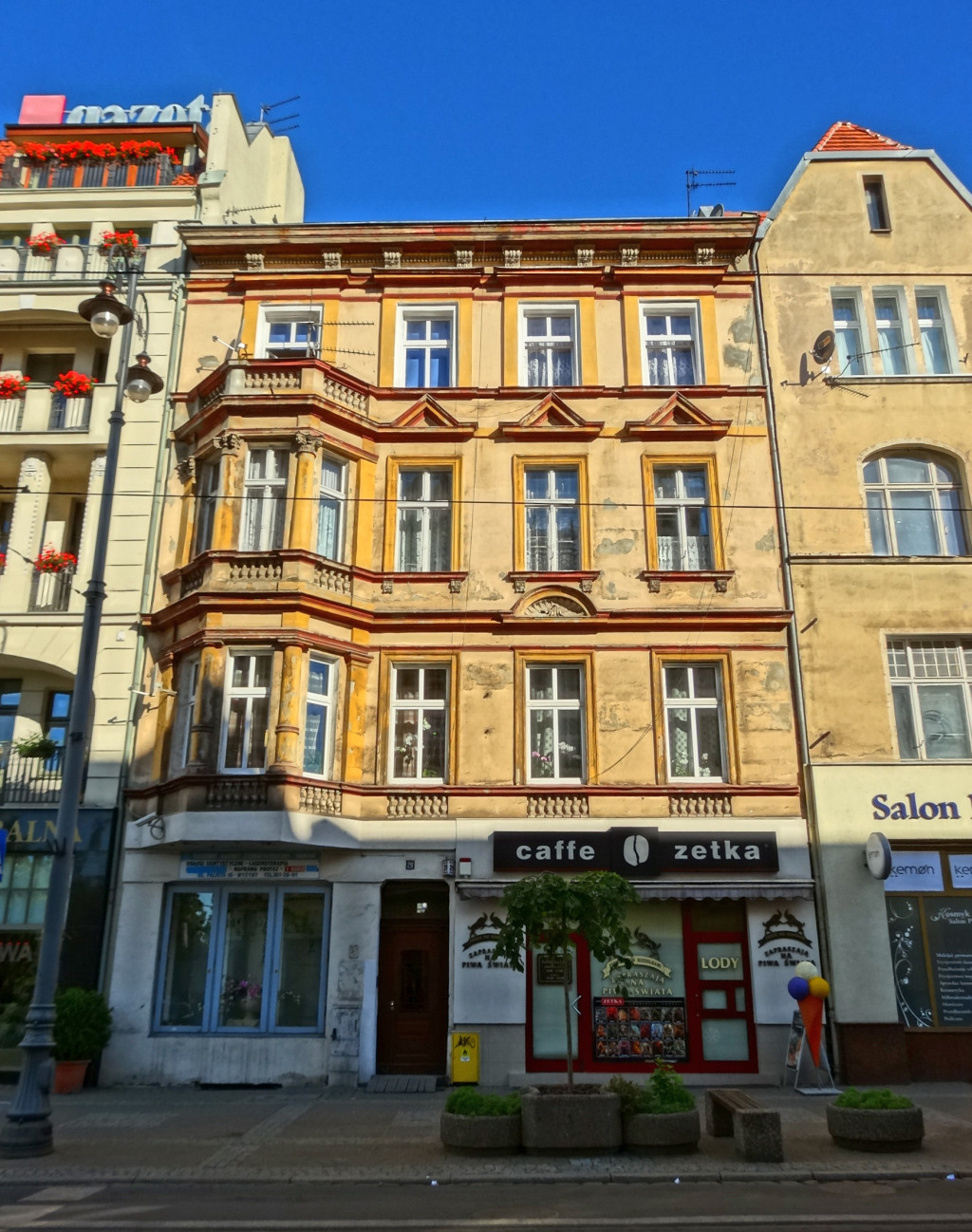
His first address at 29 Gdańska st.

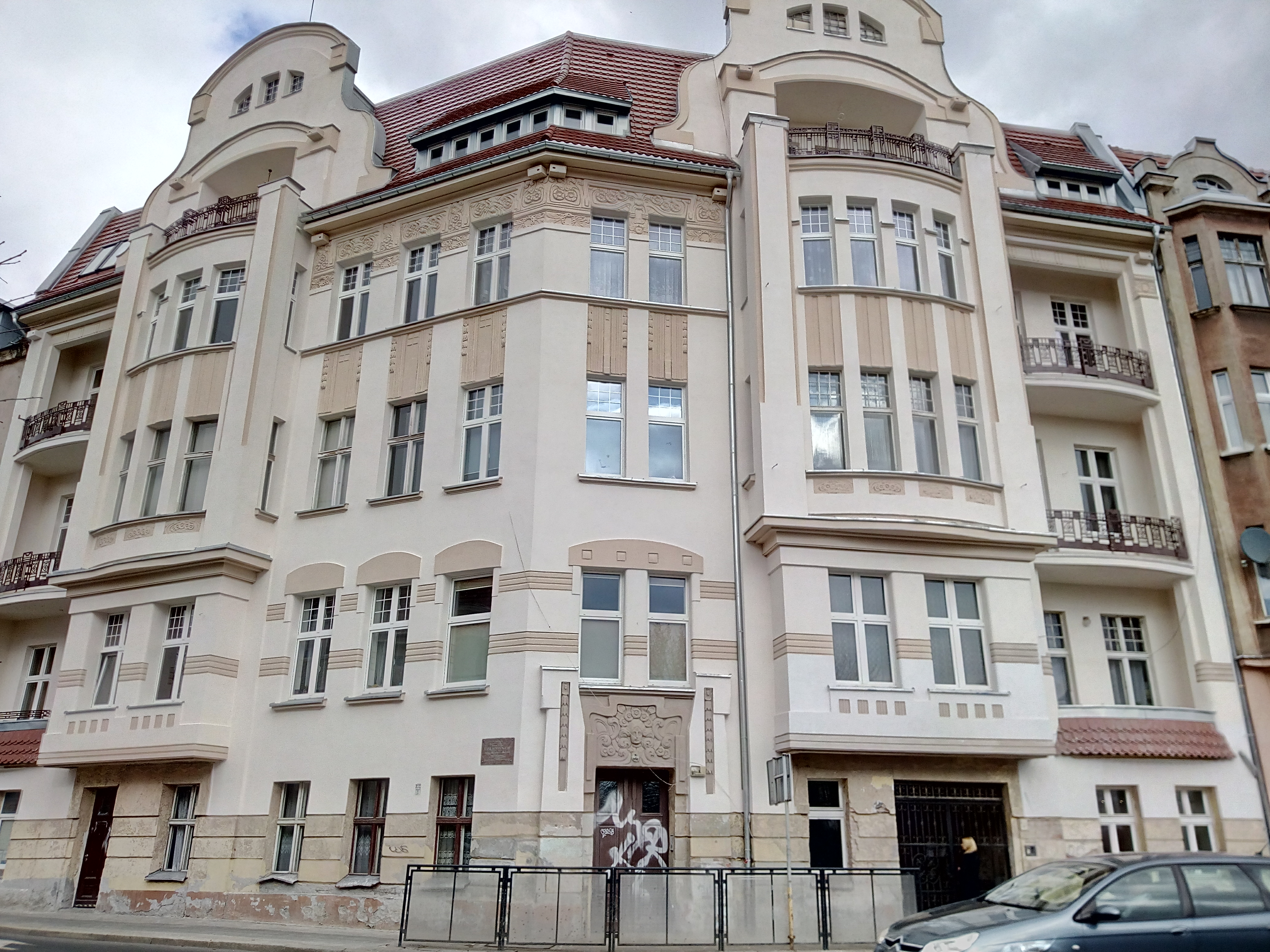
The tenement at 1 Zacisze street allocated by the city

=== First editing works ===
After leaving university, he administered his inherited estates in Samoklęski in Lublin region. In 1891, he moved to Warsaw. There, he edited and published his first monthly magazine in 1896, the "Warsaw Library", subtitled Journal dedicated to science, arts and industry (Polish: Biblioteka Warszawska. Pismo poświęcone naukom, sztukom i przemysłowi). Known as living a flourishing life, Polish literary critic Adam Grzymała-Siedlecki reported that Weyssenhoff lost his estate of Samoklęski at cards with the brother of the Tsar Alexander III, during a stay at the St. Petersburg River Yacht Club.

Weyssenhoff traveled extensively in Europe. He published a book related to his journey to Greece in 1895 ("Z Grecyi"). In 1908, he settled for three years in Steglitz, then a suburban borough of Berlin. When World War I broke out, he was in Russia where he stayed during the conflict. In 1918, he returned to the re-created Polish state and settled in Warsaw.

=== Life in Bydgoszcz and later years ===
In April 1924, probably on an advice of his nephew Władysław August Kościelski, Weyssenhoff moved to Bydgoszcz: Kościelski was the main shareholder of the "Biblioteka Polska" Publishing Institute in the city (Polish: Zakłady Graficzne "Biblioteka Polska" w Bydgoszczy), at the time one of the largest in Poland.

Initially, Weyssenhoff lived at 29 Gdańska Street. At that time, he was already a writer with a definite prestige. In particular, he had already published renowned novels: "Soból i panna", a romance story in 1912, and "Puszcza" (Wilderness) in 1915.

Thanks to his reputation, the municipal authorities allocated him a comfortable apartment at 1 Zacisze street, today's 1 Józef Weyssenhoff Square. Besides, like the writer Kazimierz Przerwa-Tetmajer, Weyssenhoff was granted a monthly subsidy. He lived alone in Bydgoszcz, but he had faithful friends who regularly visited him:

- Witold Bełza, director of the Municipal Library;
- writer Adam Grzymała-Siedlecki;
- Józef Karbowski, director of the Municipal theater.

He actively participated in the social and cultural life of Bydgoszcz, giving lectures on the works of great Polish writers, such as Adam Mickiewicz, Henryk Sienkiewicz or Juliusz Słowacki. Together, with Adam Grzymała-Siedlecki, Weyssenhoff actively joined the activities of the committee for the construction of the Henryk Sienkiewicz Monument in Bydgoszcz, the first to be erected in Poland.

Amateur of hunting, he was one of the founders of the Bydgoszcz Hunting Society. As far as literary work is concerned, he devoted his stay to writing "Jan bez ziemi" (Jean sans terre) published in 1929 and "Mój pamiętnik literacki" (My Literary Diary) in 1925. The latter, according to Grzymała-Siedlecki, was supposed to be an introduction to a larger work.

In 1928, Weyssenhoff left Bydgoszcz and moved to Witold Ploter's estate near Włocławek before settling in Warsaw definitively. In 1929, he received the Poznań literary award. In 1932, just before his demise, an academic ceremony was held in Bydgoszcz, celebrating the 40th anniversary of his artistic career. He was an esthete, collector of old prints, manuscripts, but also numismatics and engravings.

He died on 6 July 1932, in Warsaw. He was buried at the Powązki Cemetery of Warsaw.

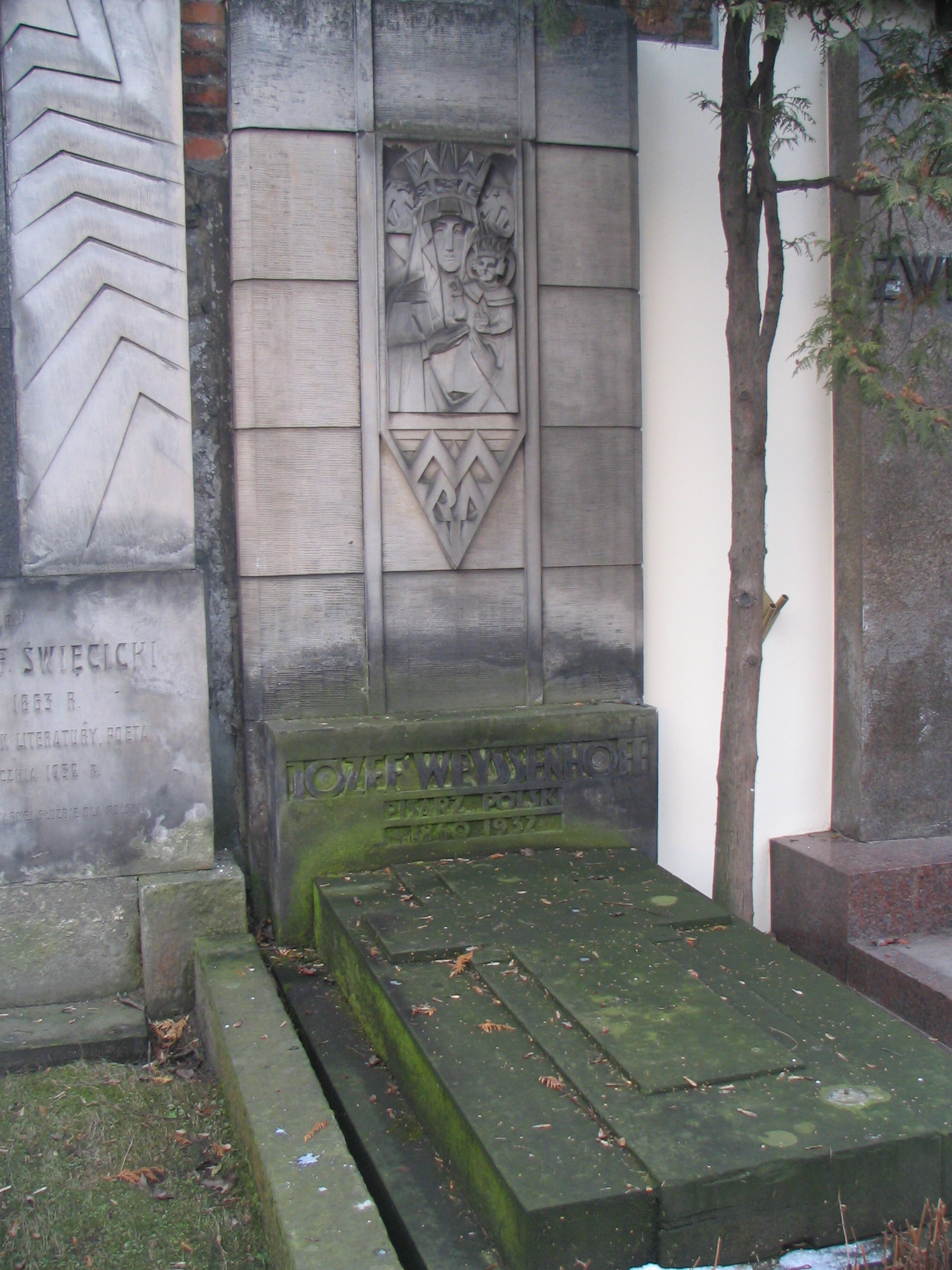
Weyssenhoff's tombstone at the Powązki Cemetery

=== Personal life and family ===
Weyssenhoff married Aleksandra Emilia Bloch, the daughter of Jan Gotlib Bloch, a Polish banker and railway tycoon, devoted to modern industrial warfare. Weyssenhoff and Alexandra lived separately from 1895 onwards. Alexandra died in 1939. They had four children:

- Wanda Maria born in 1888 in Warsaw;
- Jan Wirgiliusz Weyssenhoff, born on 27 November 1889, in Warsaw. He was a physicist, professor at the University of Vilnius, the University of Kraków and Lviv Polytechnic National University, as well as member of the Polish Academy of Arts and Sciences. He died on 11 August 1972, in Kraków;
- Aleksandra Zielewicz, born in 1891 in Samoklęski estate. She died in 1956, in Brazil;
- Róża Weyssenhoff, born in 1895 in Warsaw.

Among Weyssenhoff's ancestors was Jan Weyssenhoff (pl) (1774-1848), a Major General, who took part in the Polish–Russian War of 1792, the Kościuszko Uprising (1794), the Napoleonic Wars and the November Uprising of 1830–1831.

Józef's cousin was the painter Henryk Weyssenhoff (1859-1922). Henryk illustrated two of Józef's books, "Erotyki" (1911) and "Soból i Panna" (1913).

Józef's niece was Teresa Weyssenhoff (1930-1984). She was a Polish writer, author of books related to the figures of the Catholic Church and an economist. During World War II, she lived in Warsaw and participated in the Warsaw Uprising of 1944.

Józef's nephew was Władysław August Kościelski (1886-1933), a Polish poet, publisher and main shareholder of the "Biblioteka Polska" Publishing Institute in Bydgoszcz and Warsaw.

== Themes and works ==
Weyssenhoff is considered as a great stylist, in particular in his descriptions of nature and hunting. He wrote novels, short stories, poems and memoires. Additionally, he translated into Polish some of Heinrich Heine's works.

Weyssenhoff's themes tend to refer to the tradition of Henryk Sienkiewicz, although his cosmopolitanism and sybaritism often opposed his contemporary aristocratic environment. He also liked to praise the virtues and traditional culture of the Eastern Borderlands nobility.

After 1905, he published a series of political novels:

- about his activism "Budzisz, Dni polityczne" (Wake up, Political days) (1916);
- against the aspirations of democratic and liberal movements and revolutionary actions. "Hetmani" (1911) was built as a satire of the Polish Legions in World War I;
- championing the formation of an independent Polish state ("Cudno and Ziemia cudeńska"-1921).

=== Main works ===
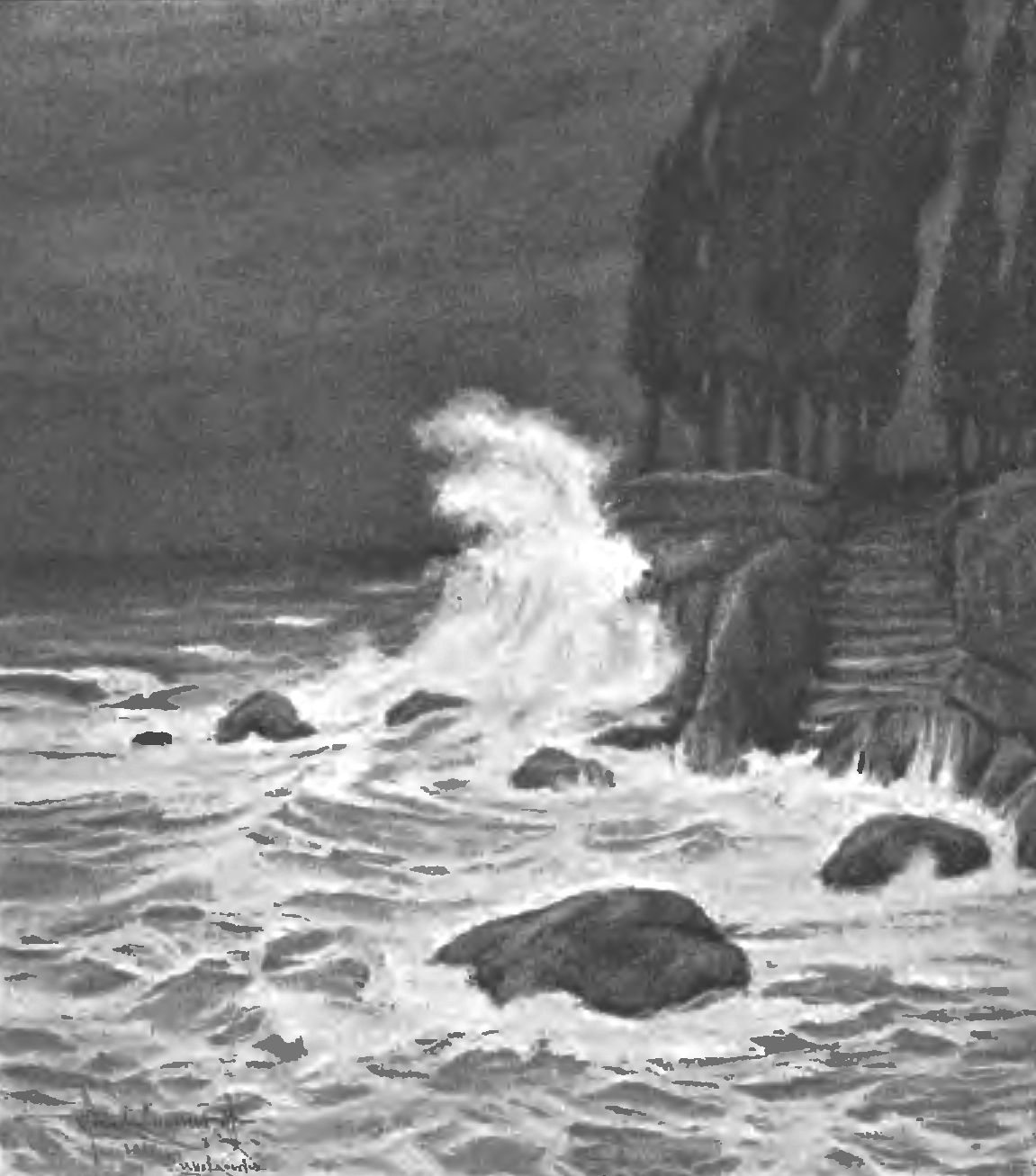
Illustration from Erotyki by Henryk Weyssenhoff

- "Lyrica" (1894);
- "Z Grecyi" (In Greece) (1895);
- "Żywot i myśli Zygmunta Podfilipskiego" (Life and thoughts of Zygmunt Podfilipski) (1898), a satirical novel;
- "Sprawa Dołęgi" (1901), supporting Polish nationalism;
- "Za błękitami" (1903);
- "Zaręczyny Jana Bełzkiego" (The engagement of Jan Bełzki) (1903);
- "Syn marnotrawny" (The prodigal son) (1905);
- "Narodziny działacza" (The birth of an activist) (1906);
- "Forminga, urywek indyjskiej powieści" (Forminga, excerpt from an Indian novel) (1906);
- "W ogniu" (In fire) (1908);
- " Unja" (Union) (1910);
- "Erotyki" (1911), poetry;

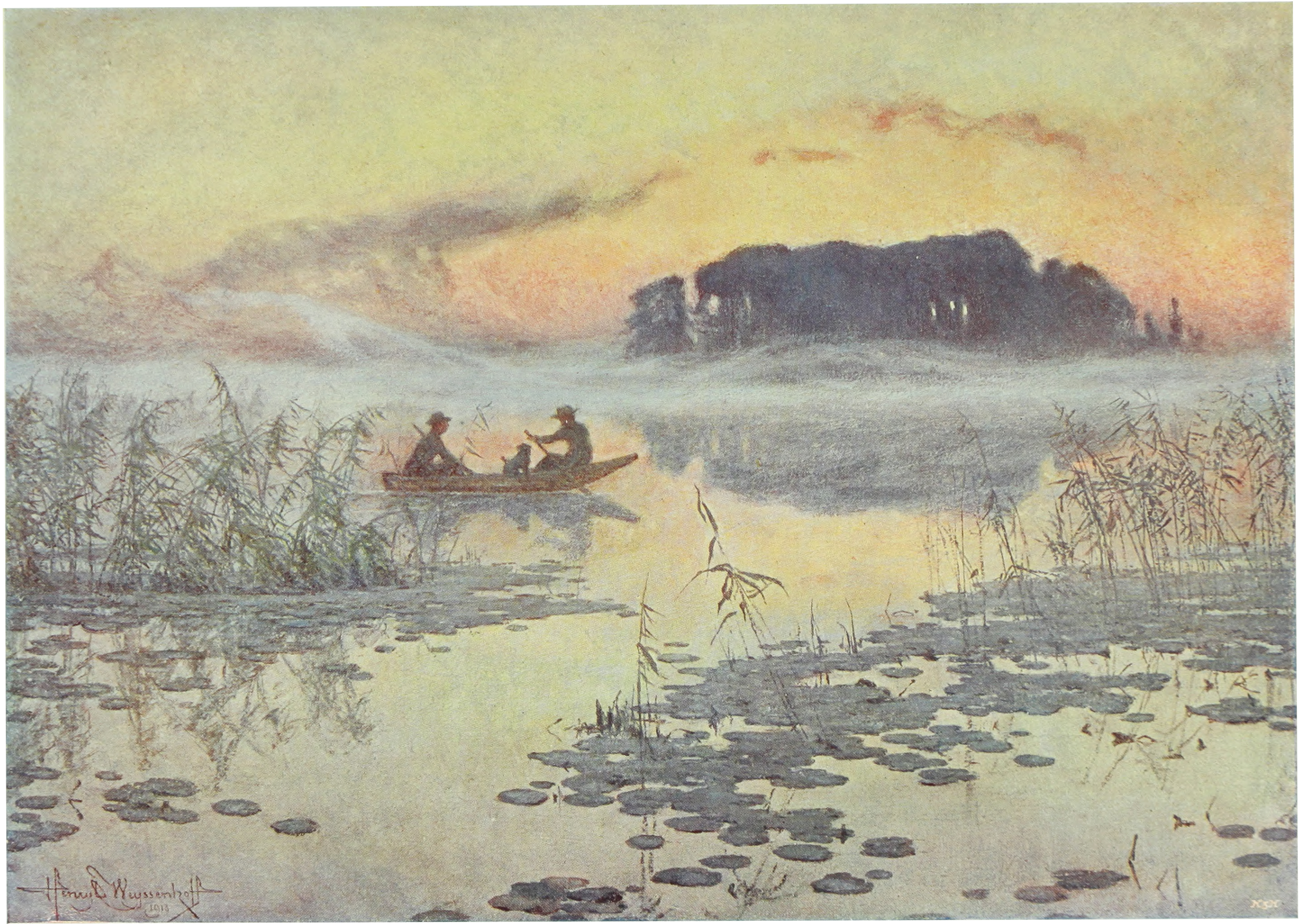
Illustration from Soból i panna by Henryk Weyssenhoff

- "Soból i panna" (1911), a novel loosely based on the manorial lifestyle of the Weyssenhoff family;
- "Hetmani, powieść współczesna" (1911), a novel;
- "Gromada:powieść" (1913), a novel;
- "Gniazda sieroce" (Orphan nests) (1914);
- "Puszcza" (Wilderness) (1915), a novel recalling the culture of the Eastern Borderlands nobility;
- "Budzisz, Dni polityczne" (Wake up, Political days) (1916),;
- "Noc i świt" (Night and Dawn) (1924);
- "Cudno i ziemia cudeńska" (Wonder and the land of wonders) (1921);
- "Pisma", t. 1-13 (Correspondences) (1927–1928);
- "Mój pamiętnik literacki" (My literary diary) (1925), written during his stay in Bydgoszcz;
- "Jan bez Ziemi" (Jean sans terre) (1929);
- "Pod Piorunami" (Under the lightnings) (1930).

== Awards and decorations ==
- Poznań literary award, 1929;
- Officer Cross of the Order of the Polonia Restituta (2 May 1923);
- Golden Cross of Merit (23 May 1932).

== Commemorations ==
Zacisze Street, where Weyssenhoff lived while in Bydgoszcz, was renamed Weyssenhoff Square.

In 1960, a red granite commemorative plaque has been unveiled at the occasion of the 100th anniversary of his birth; it was placed on the front wall of the building he lived in at 1 Weyssenhoff Square. The text mentions "Between 1924 and 1928, has lived here the Polish writer Józef Weyssenhoff (1860–1932), eulogist of nature and hunting."

== See also ==
- Bydgoszcz
- Eastern Borderlands
- Henryk Weyssenhoff
- List of Polish people

== Bibliography ==
- (in Polish) Danowska, Ewa (2015). Józef Weyssenhoff (1860–1932) – pisarz, bibliofil, kolekcjoner. Nieznane oblicze twórcy. Kielce: Wydawnictwo Uniwersytetu Jana Kochanowskiego. ISBN 9788371336386.
- (in Polish) Janusz Kutta, Marek Romaniuk, Stanisław Błażejewski (1994). Bydgoski Słownik Biograficzny. Bydgoszcz: Kujawsko-Pomorskie Towarzystwo Kulturalne. pp. 68–69.
- (in Polish) Reychman, Kazimierz (1936). Szkice genealogiczne: Serja 1. Warsaw: F. Hoesick. pp. 25–27.
