= Józef Weyssenhoff Square =

Open space in Bydgoszcz, Poland

Coordinates: 53.1313°N 18.0120°E

Bydgoszcz
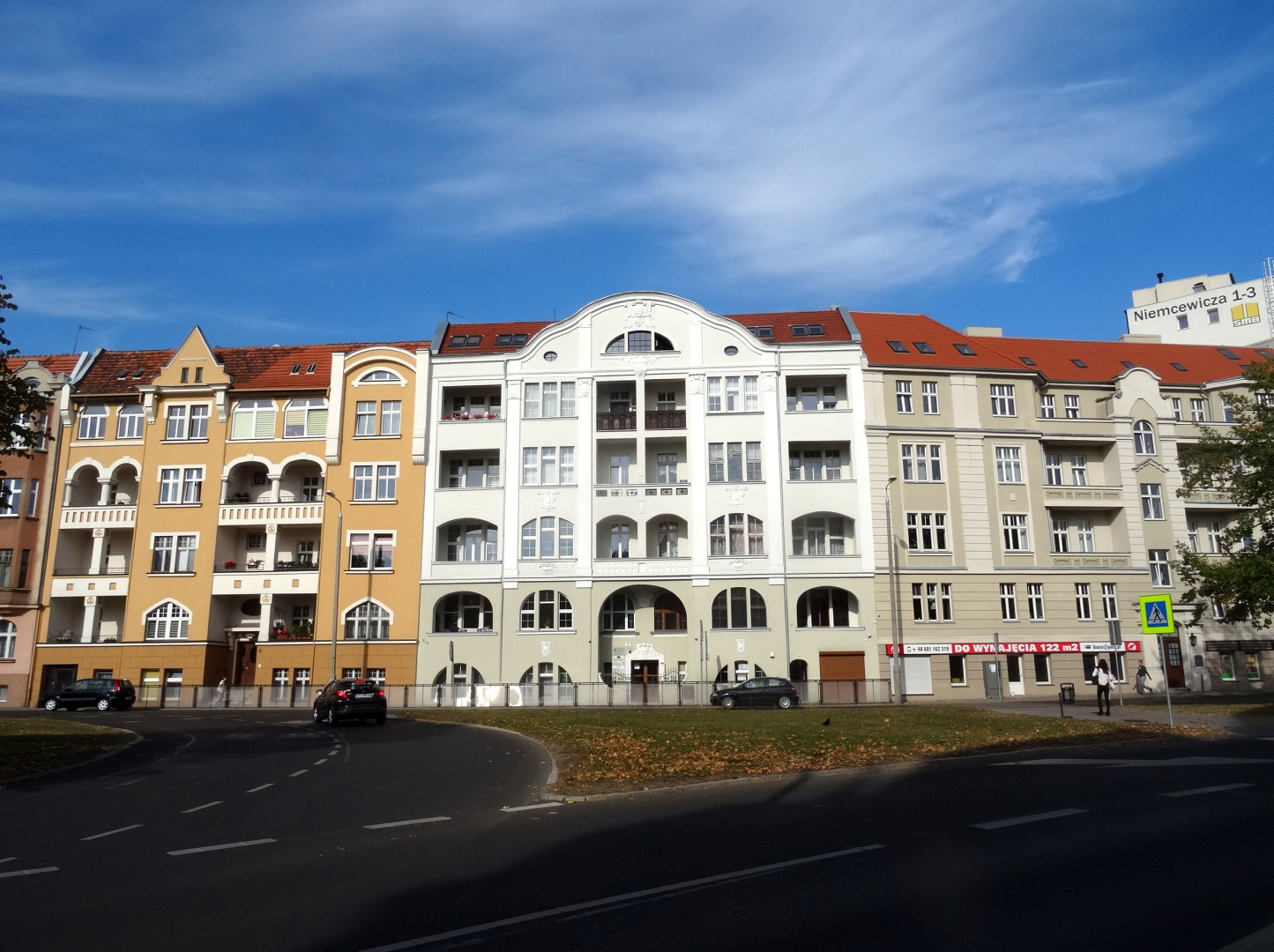
- Interactive map of Józef Weyssenhoff Square
- Native name: Plac Józefa Weyssenhoffa (Polish)
- Former name(s): Bülowplatz, Plac Zacisze, Johann Fichte Platz
- Part of: Bydgoszcz Old Town district
- Namesake: Józef Weyssenhoff
- Owner: City of Bydgoszcz
- Location: Bydgoszcz, Poland

Construction
- Completion: 1903

Józef Weyssenhoff Square is an open place in the downtown district of Bydgoszcz, Poland. Several of its buildings are registered on the Kuyavian-Pomeranian Voivodeship Heritage List.

== Location ==
The area links Adam Mickiewicz Alley, Ossoliński Alley and Powstańców Wielkopolskich Alley. Northern facades date back to the late 19th-century style, while southern ones display modernist features from the first decade of the 20th century.

== Naming ==
- 1906–1920, Bülowplatz, after Bernhard von Bülow;
- 1920–1933, Plac Zacisze ("Tranquillity Square")
- 1933–1939, Plac Józefa Weyssenhoffa, after Józef Weyssenhoff, Polish writer and literary critic, who lived at Nr. 1 from 1924 to 1928;
- 1939–1945, Johann Fichte Platz, after Johann Gottlieb Fichte;
- Since 1945, Plac Józefa Weyssenhoffa.

The current name refers to Józef Weyssenhoff (1860–1932), a Polish writer, novelist, and poet who lived at the tenement at No. 1 in the 1920s.

== History ==
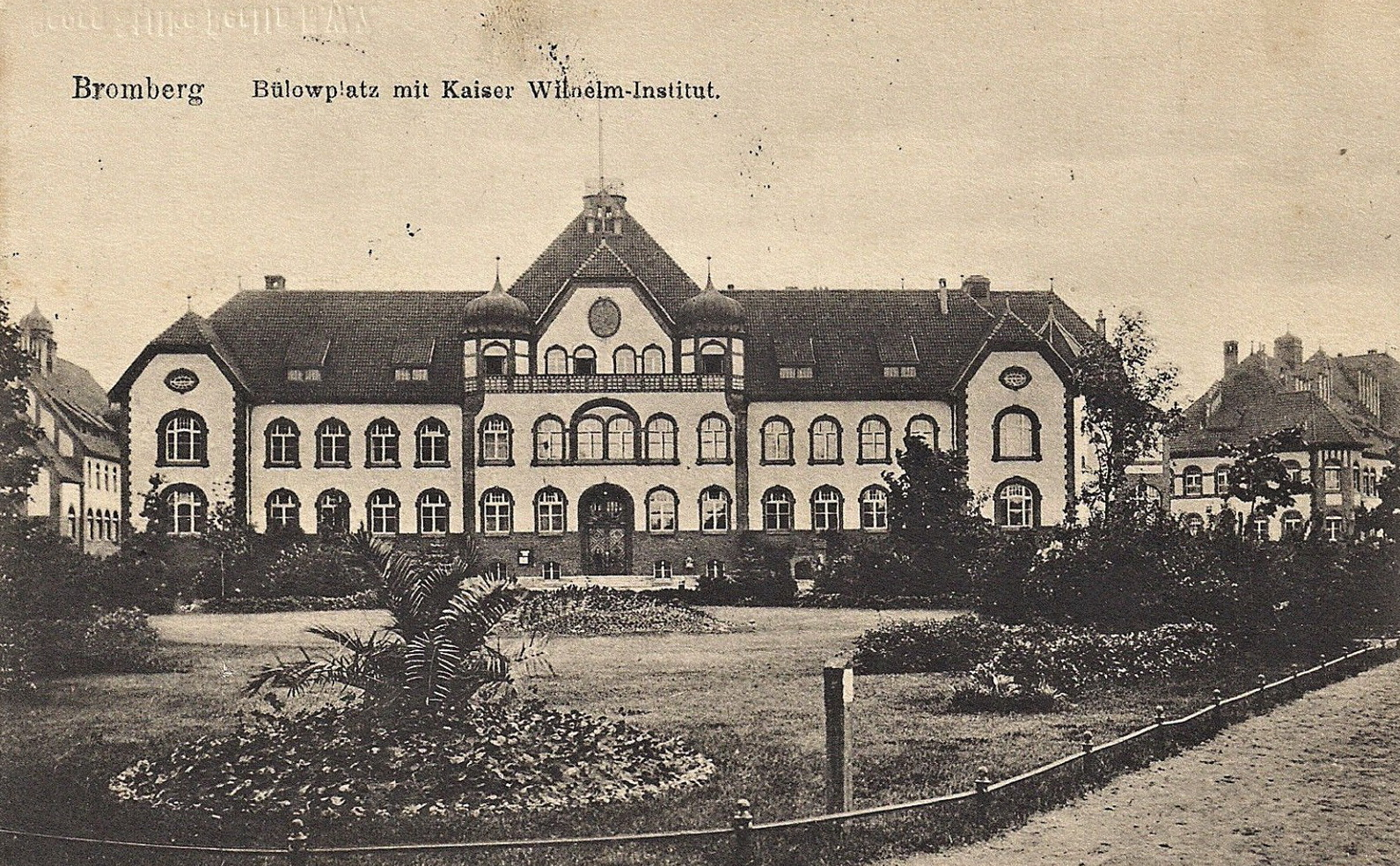
Bülowplatz, ca 1911

The square was founded in 1903 in the same conditions as Adam Mickiewicz Alley. It is a triangular square from which radiated:

- Bülow straße (today Adam Mickiewicz Alley) to the north west;
- Hohenzzolernstrasse (today Ossoliński Alley) to the south-east;
- In the late 1930s, the Powstańców Wielkopolskich Alley led an uprising in the east.

In the middle were planted flowerbeds, shrubs and trees. In 1926, coniferous and deciduous trees were planted. Between 1905 and 1911, a frontage of five-story apartment buildings was built, following Art Nouveau and Historicism styles.

== Architecture ==
Frontages of Józef Weyssenhoff Square compose a complex of townhouses inscribed in the German variant of Art Nouveau architecture (German: Jugendstil). Predominant forms evoke quietness, through varied bay windows, divided balconies and loggias integrating wavy lines, wavy gables, vaulted windows and portals. Decoration combines organic themes with geometric forms, like rectangular and square shapes, grouped in series and friezes. The ensemble reminds one of the Baroque style by applying domes avant-corps and towers topped with peaks.

Some of the architects who designed those buildings had a significant influence on Bydgoszcz urbanism:

- Rudolf Kern, who also built tenements in Gdańska Street at 5, 67, 66–68 and 71;
- Erich Lindenburger, who also constructed at 41,43,45,47 Dworcowa Street;
- Paul Böhm, who realized houses at 1 and 3 August Cieszkowski Street in Bydgoszcz;
- Józef Święcicki, known for its dozens of realization in Gdańska Street;
- Bogdan Raczkowski, designer of the Polonia Bydgoszcz Stadium and the Antoni Jurasz University Hospital in the 1930s.

For almost the entire post-war period, tenements have been property of the state. In 1990, the city of Bydgoszcz owned them back, but at the time, they were falling into disrepair as a result of underinvestment, lack of maintenance and general neglect of Art Nouveau monuments. Buildings have been restored after 2002.

== Main buildings ==
=== Tenement at 1 Józef Weyssenhoff Square ===
1905–1906, by Rudolf Kern

Art Nouveau

This is the house where Józef Weyssenhoff lived in from 1924 to 1928; a plaque has been placed on the facade in memoriam.

Both facades display bay windows with loggias or balconies. A richly decorated frieze runs at the bottom of the gable boasting dormers.

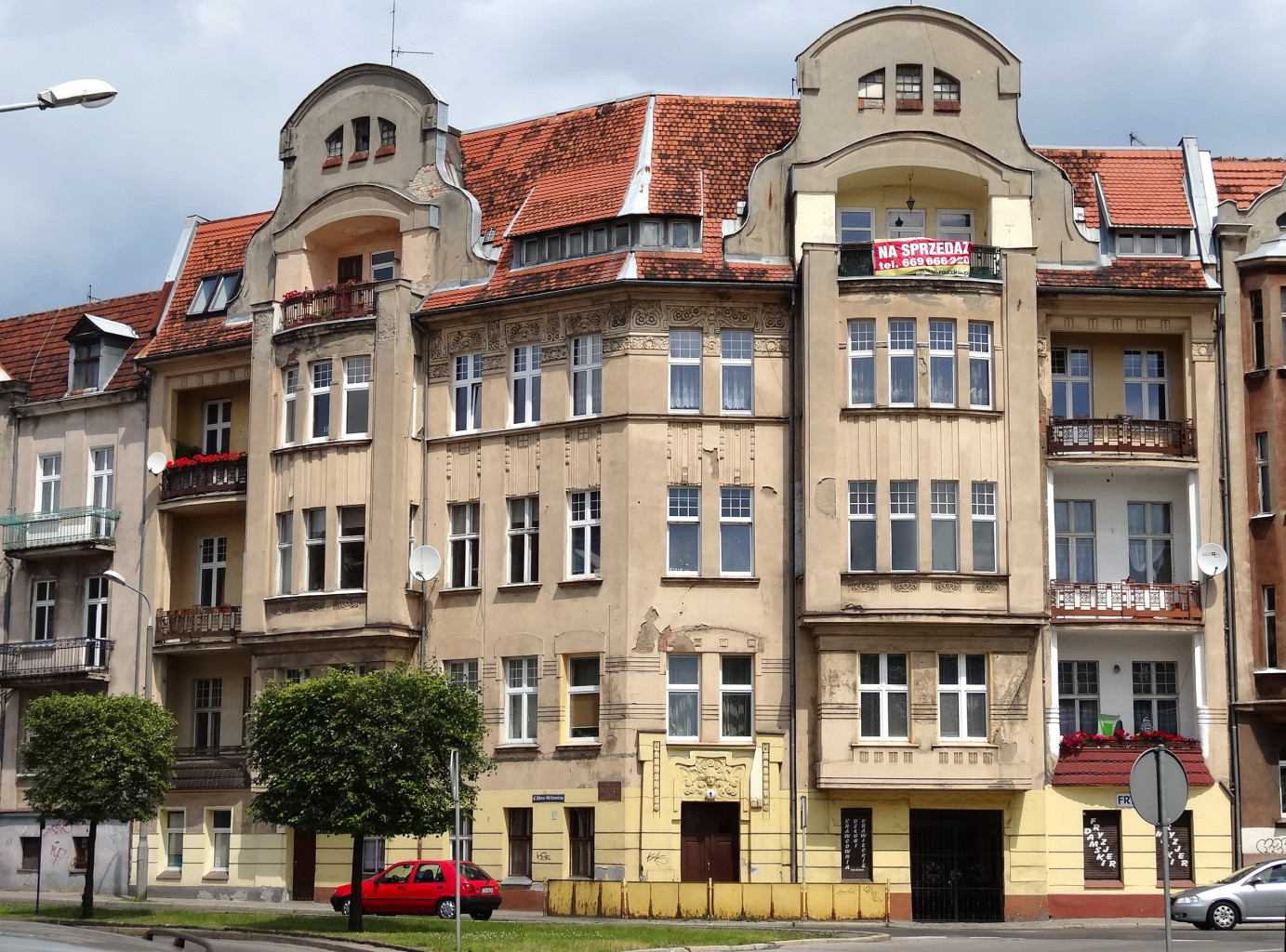
General view of frontages

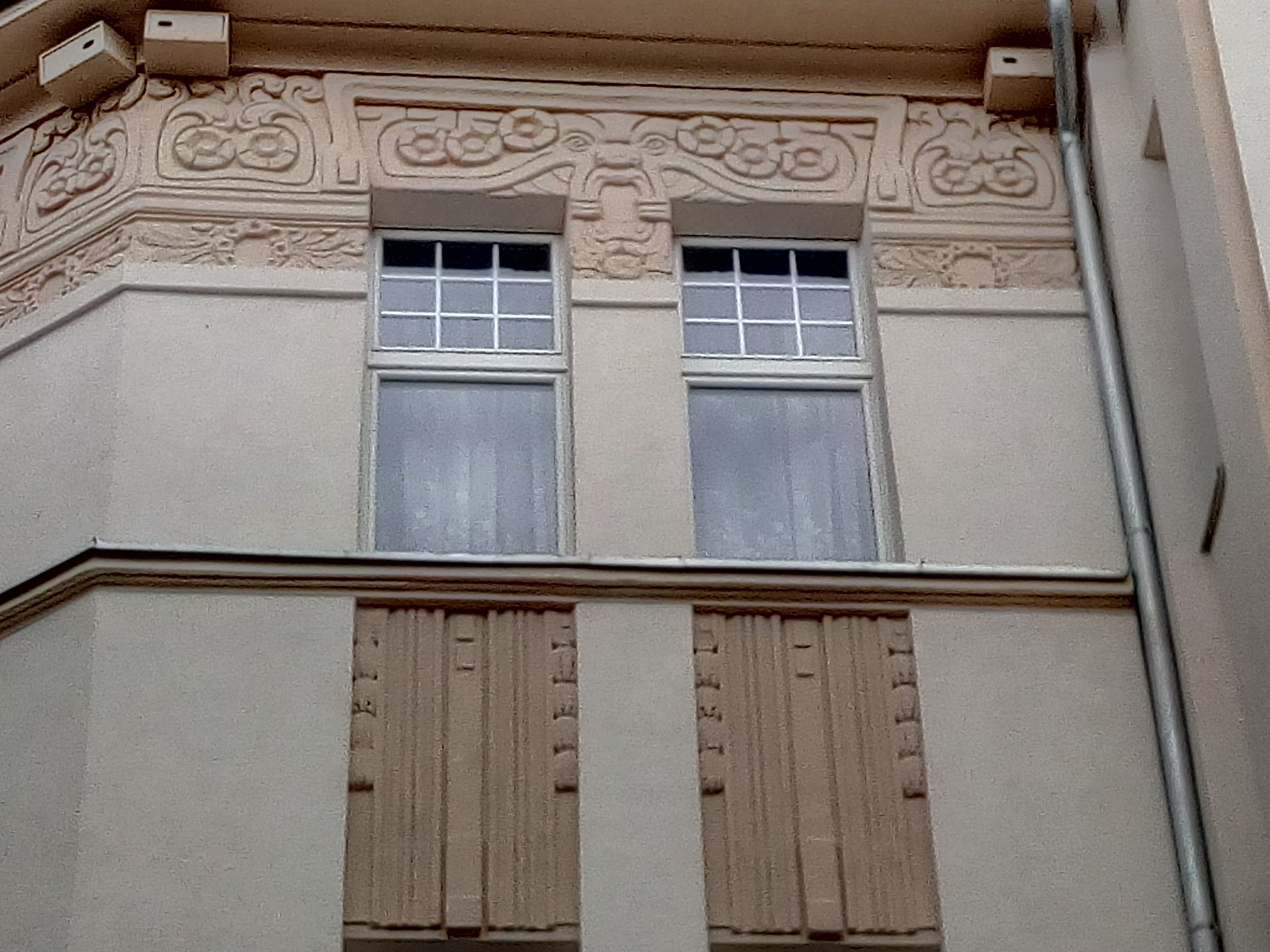
Detail of stuccoed motifs

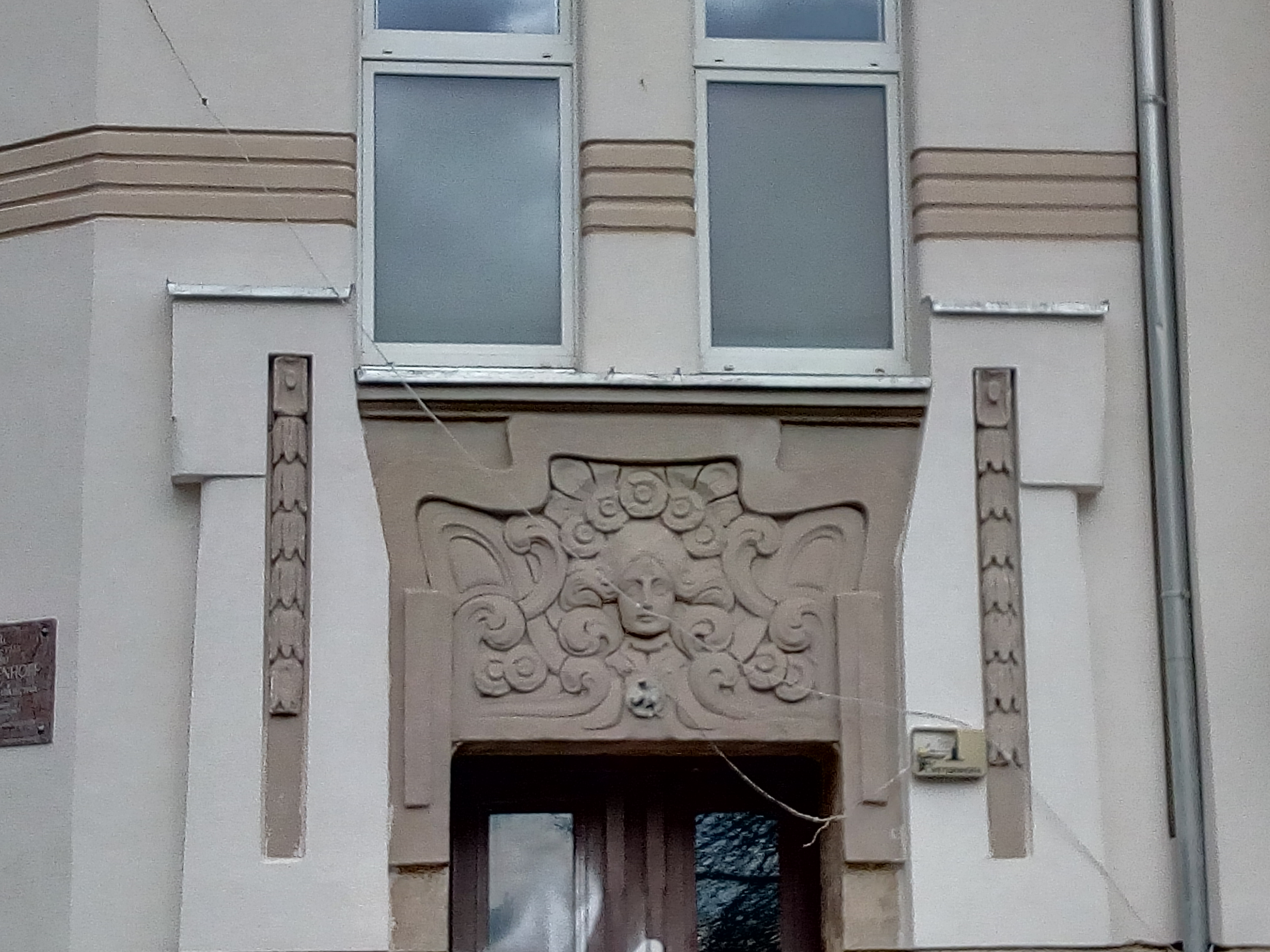
Adorned door

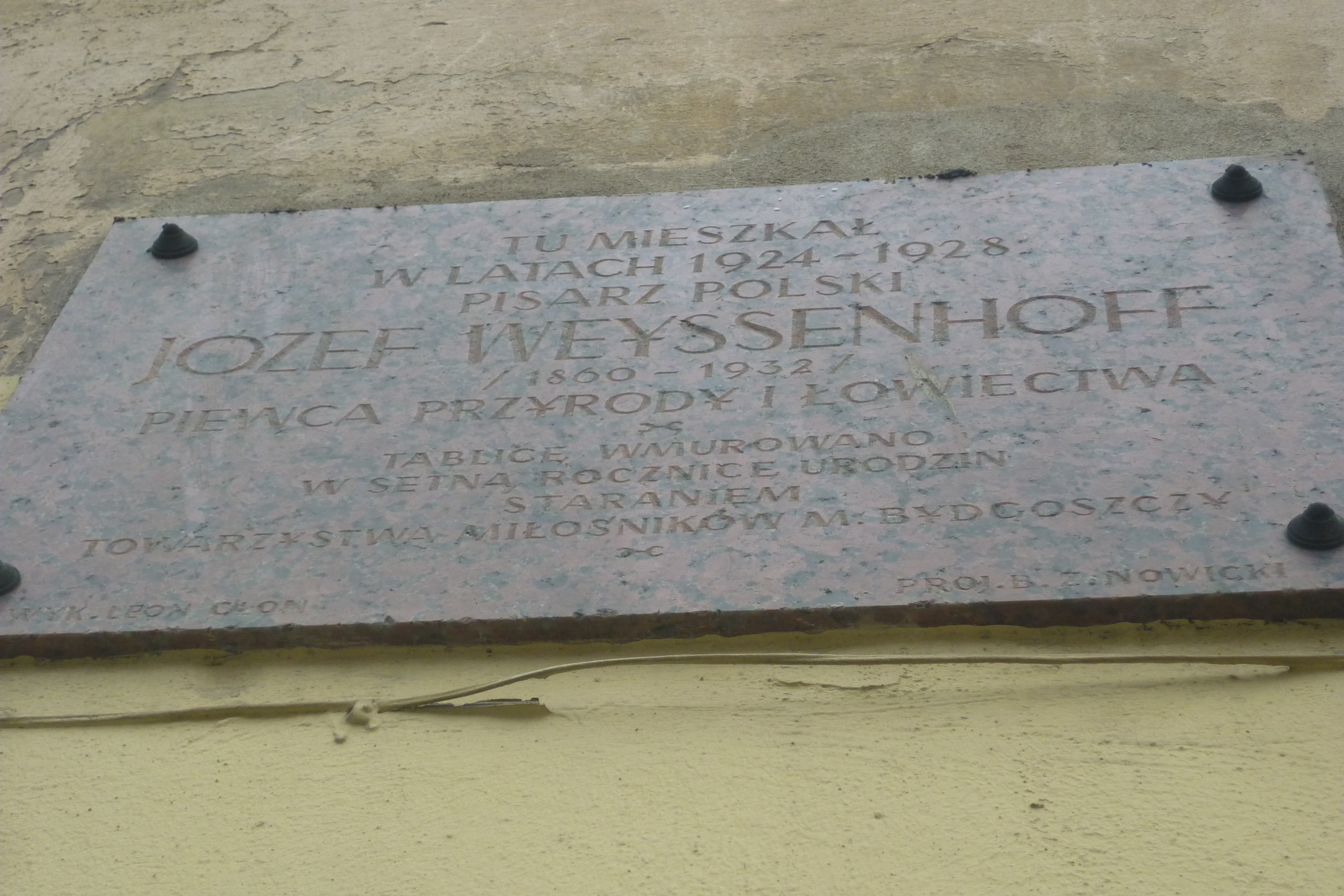
Plaque on memoriam of J. Weyssenhoff

=== Tenement at 2 Józef Weyssenhoff Square ===
1927, by Bogdan Raczkowski

Modern Architecture

House on the border of the Sielanka district, displaying a mix of functionalist style (left side) and eclectic shapes (right side) with a loggia and Mansard roof.

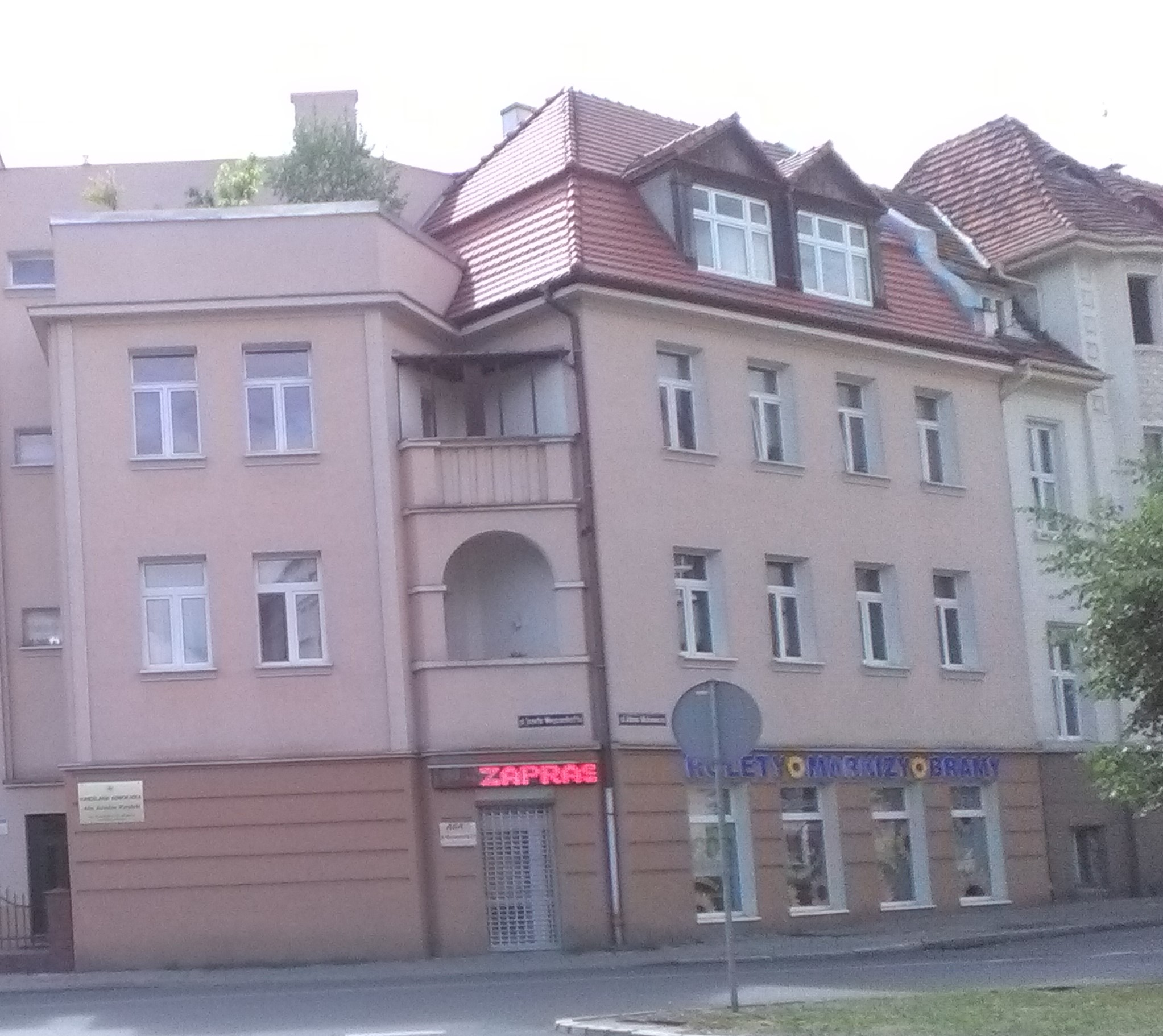
General view of frontages

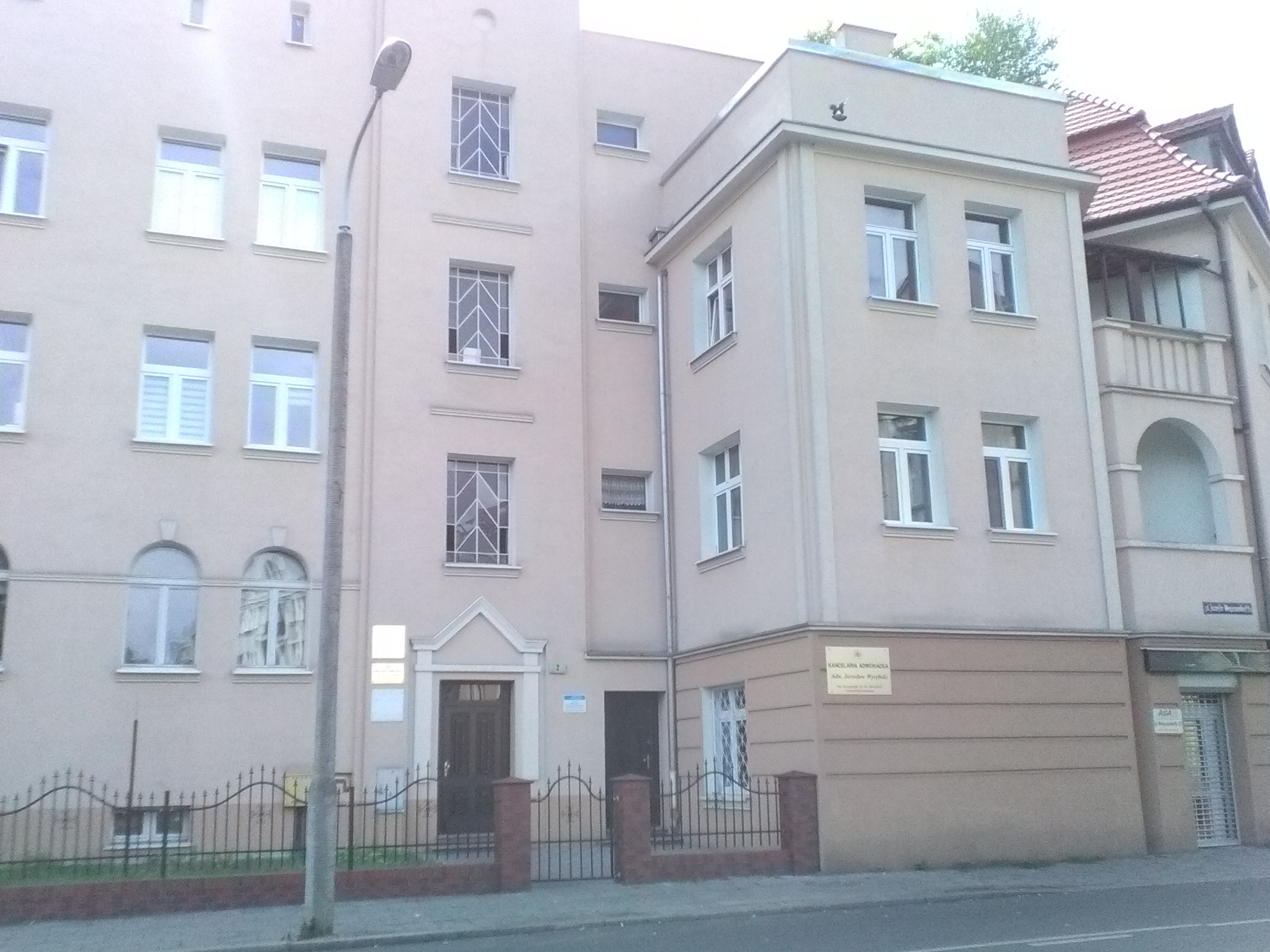
Functionalist facade

=== Tenement at 3 Józef Weyssenhoff Square ===
1905–1910, by Erich Lindenburger

Art Nouveau

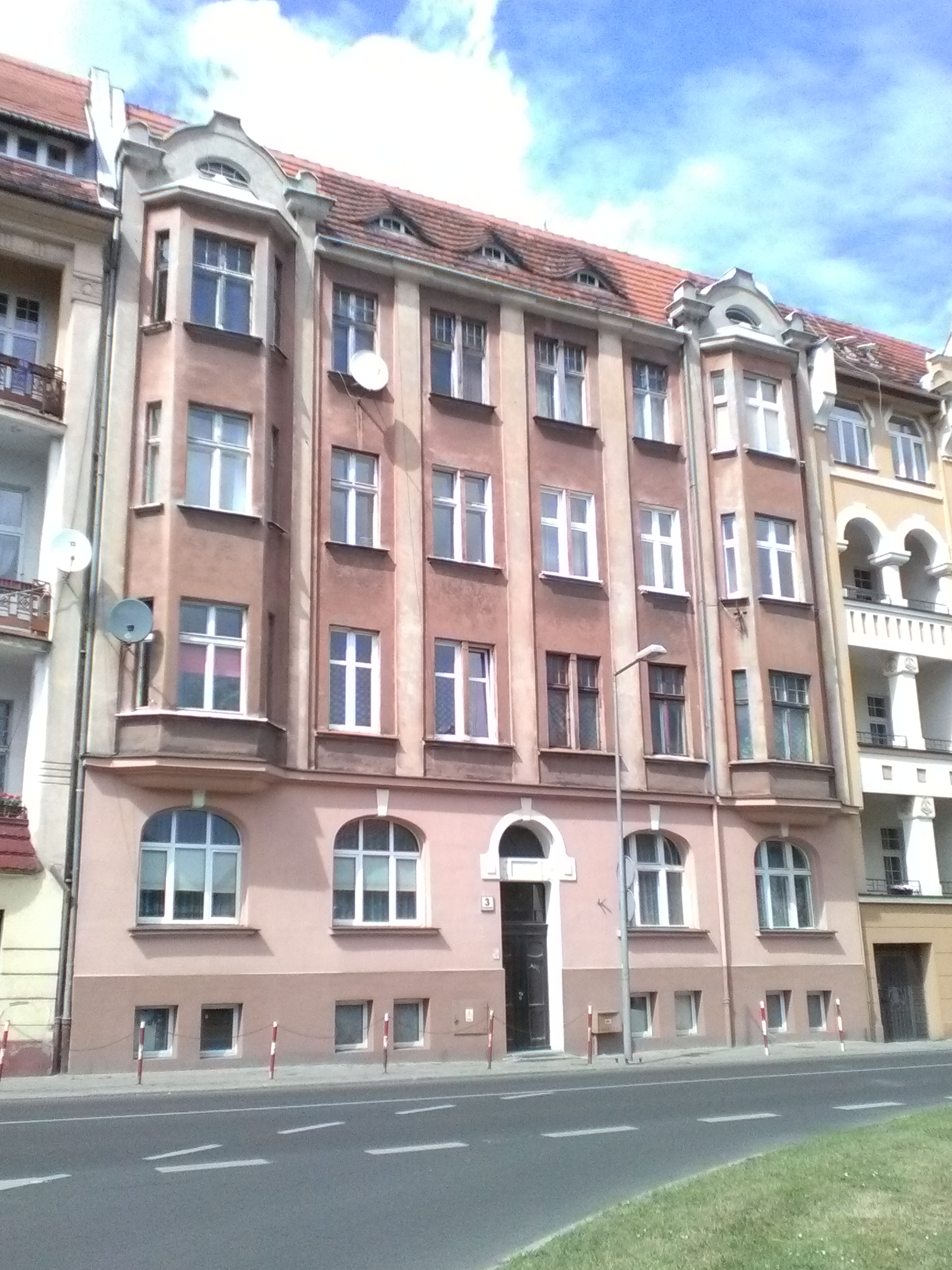
Main elevation

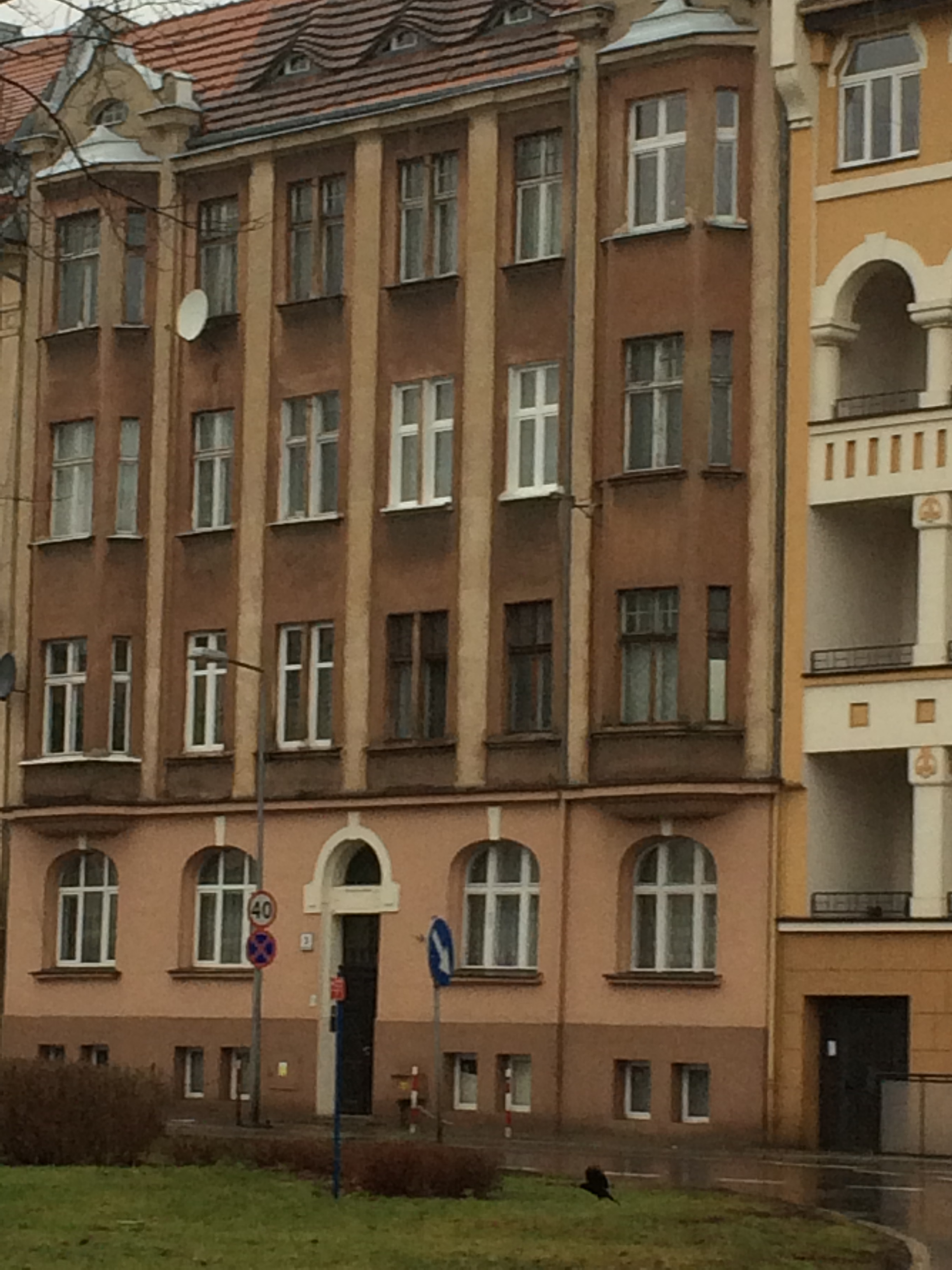
Main elevation

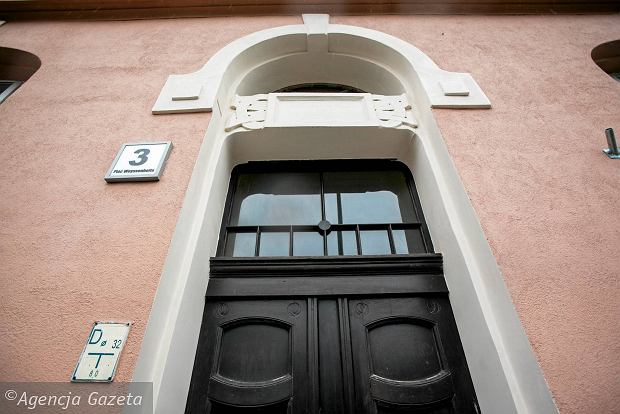
Portal detail

=== Tenement at 4 Józef Weyssenhoff Square ===
1933, by Eugeniusz Wellman

Modern Architecture

Functionalist edifice, abutted to Nr.2.

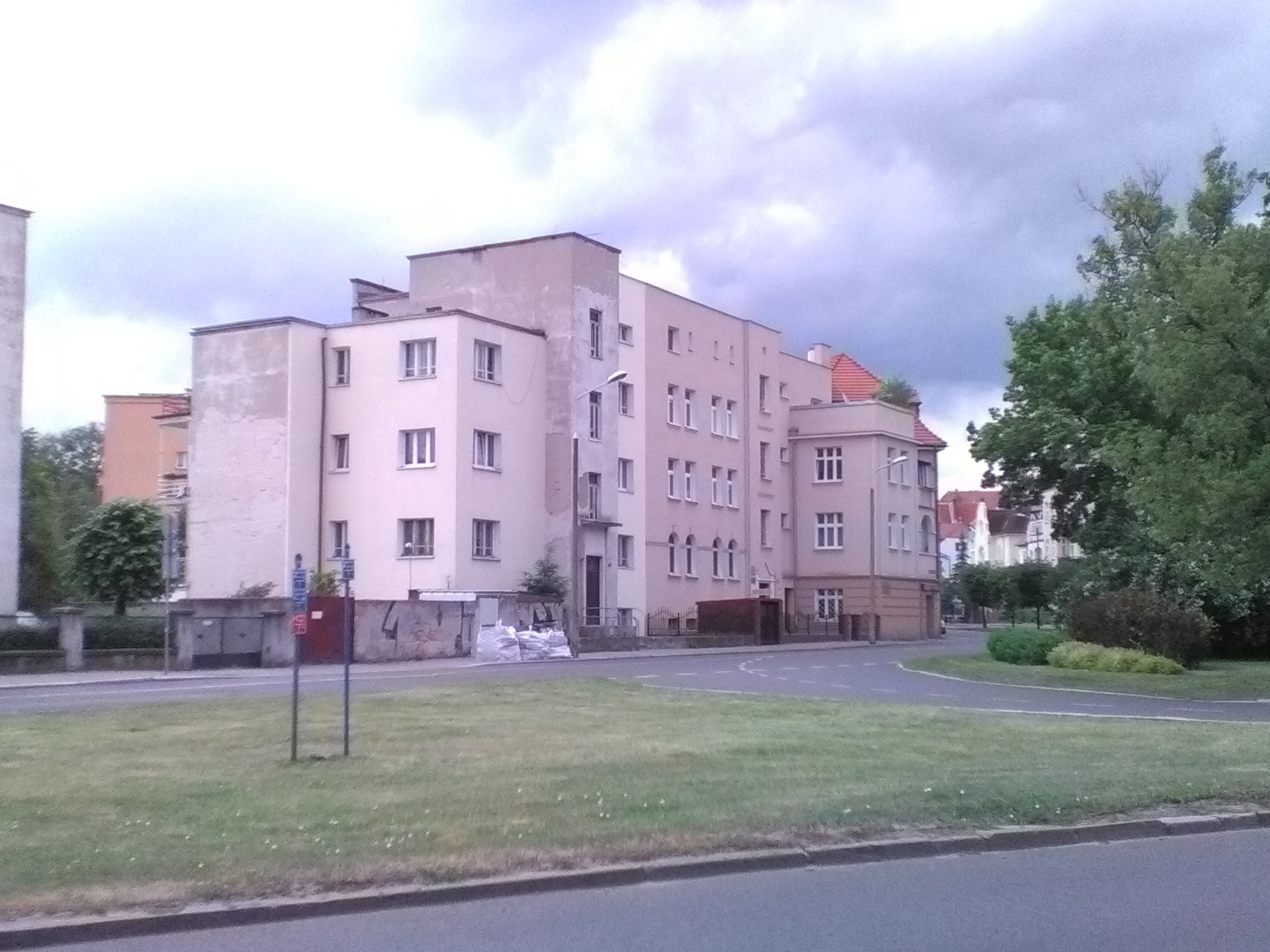
View of Nr.4 (forefront), with Nr.2 in the background.

=== Tenement at 5 Józef Weyssenhoff Square ===
Registered on Kuyavian-Pomeranian Voivodeship heritage list, Nr.743201-Reg.A/1573 (October 29, 2010)

1908–1909, by Paul Böhm

Art Nouveau

At the beginning of the 20th century, Wiktor Weynerowski, entrepreneur and father of Antoni Weynerowski, lived there. The facade displays 3 levels of balconies. The building has been recently refurbished.

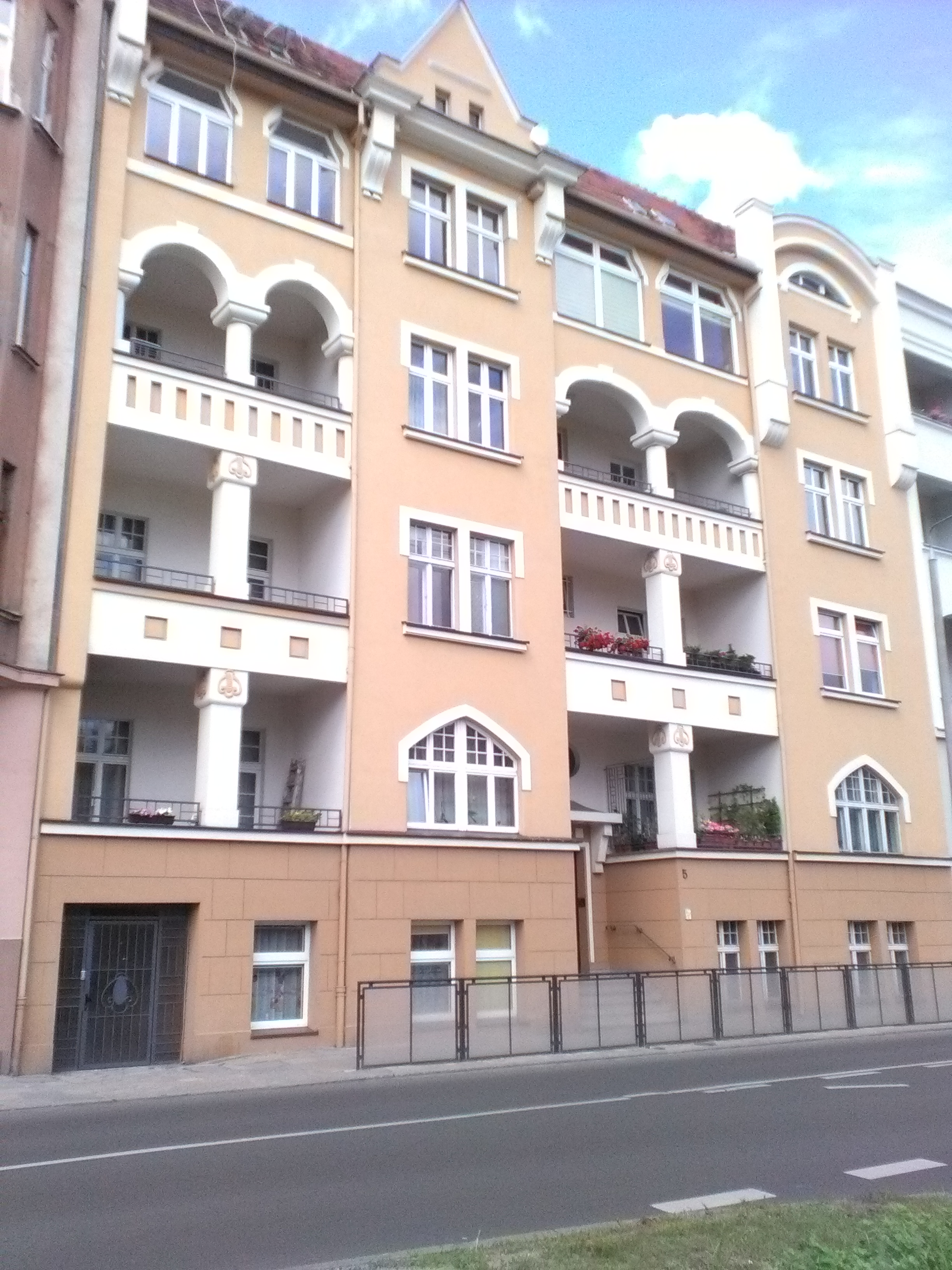
General view

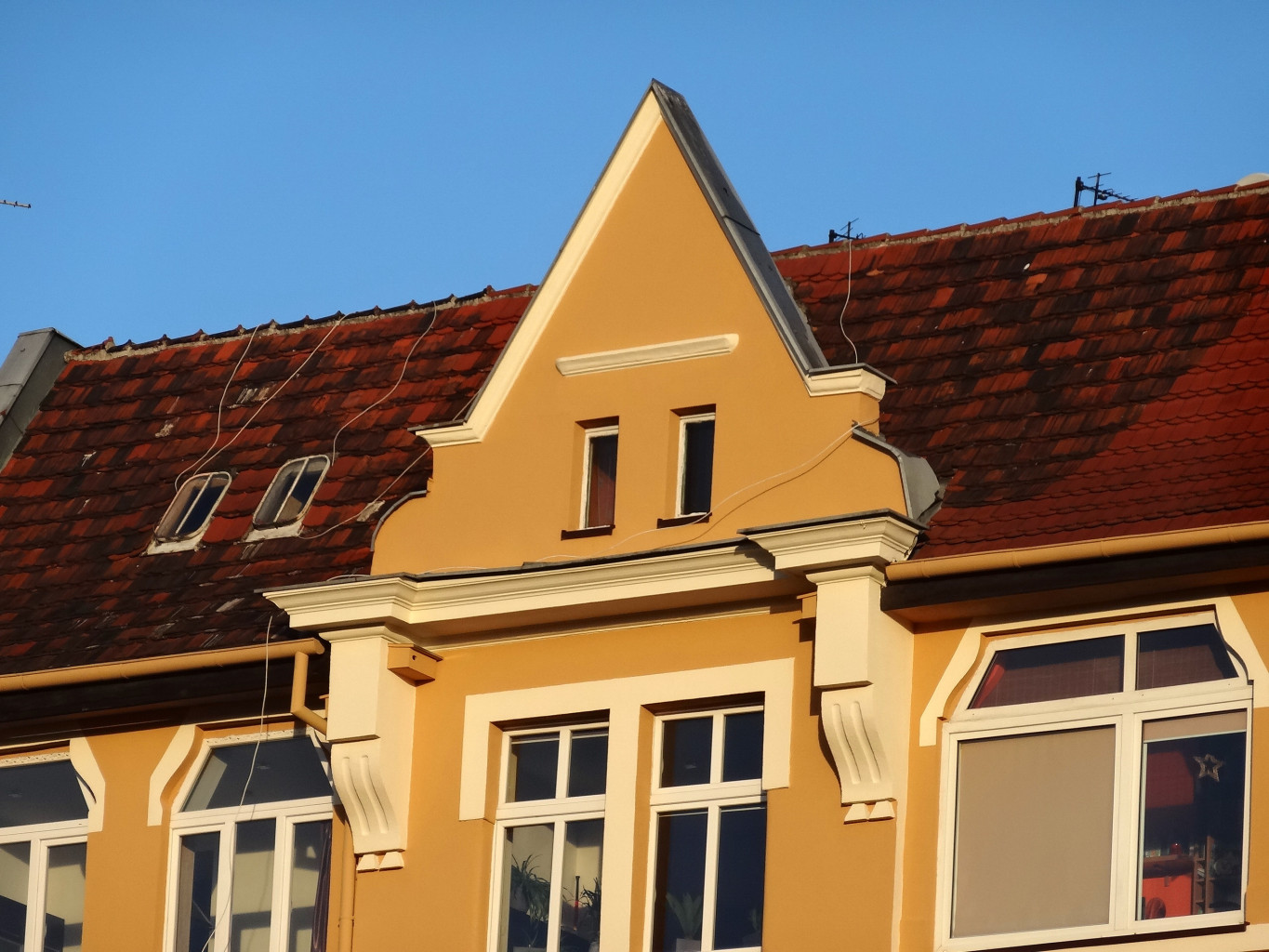
Detail of the house's gable

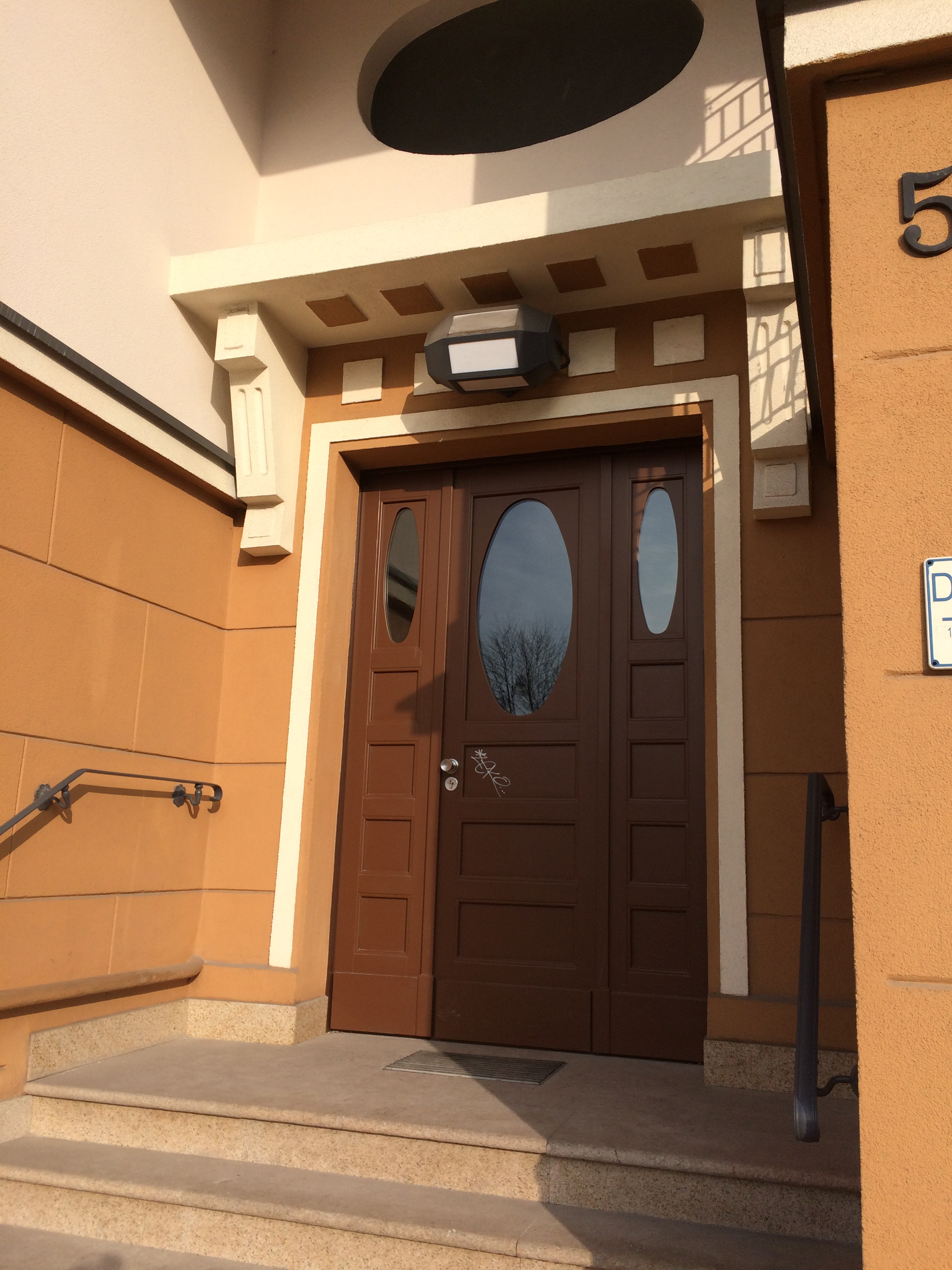
Main entry gate

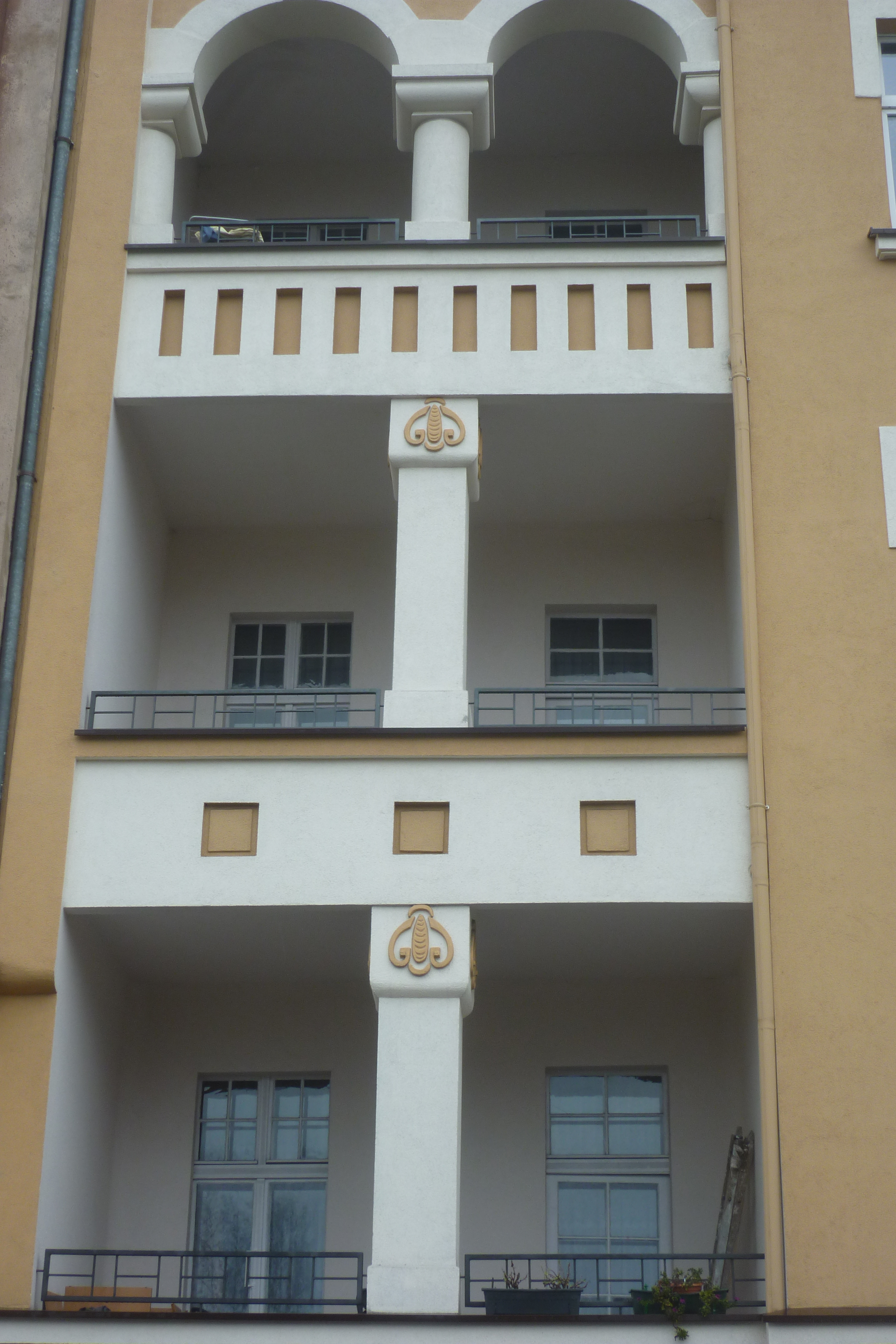
Detail of balconies facade at Nr.5

=== House at 6 Józef Weyssenhoff Square ===
1934–1935, by Konstanty Dzielinski

Modern Architecture

Functionalist house, similar to buildings down Ossoliński Alley.

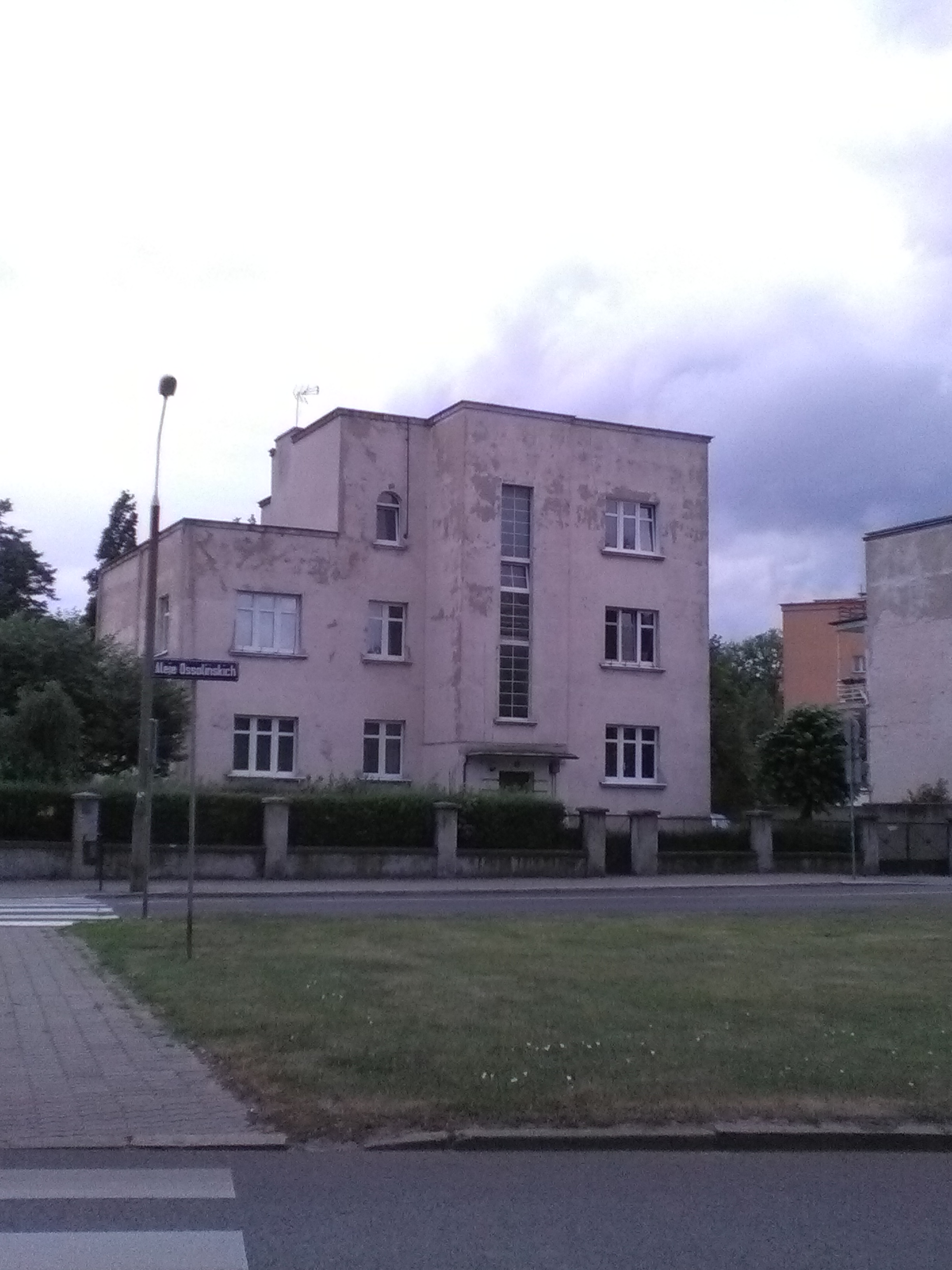
View from Ossoliński Alley.

=== Tenement at 7 Józef Weyssenhoff Square ===
1909–1910

Art Nouveau

The facade is characterised by a balanced, even symmetry around the large arcade running above the entry gate. This round motif is recurrent through the whole frontage, from the ground level arcades up to the curved pediment.

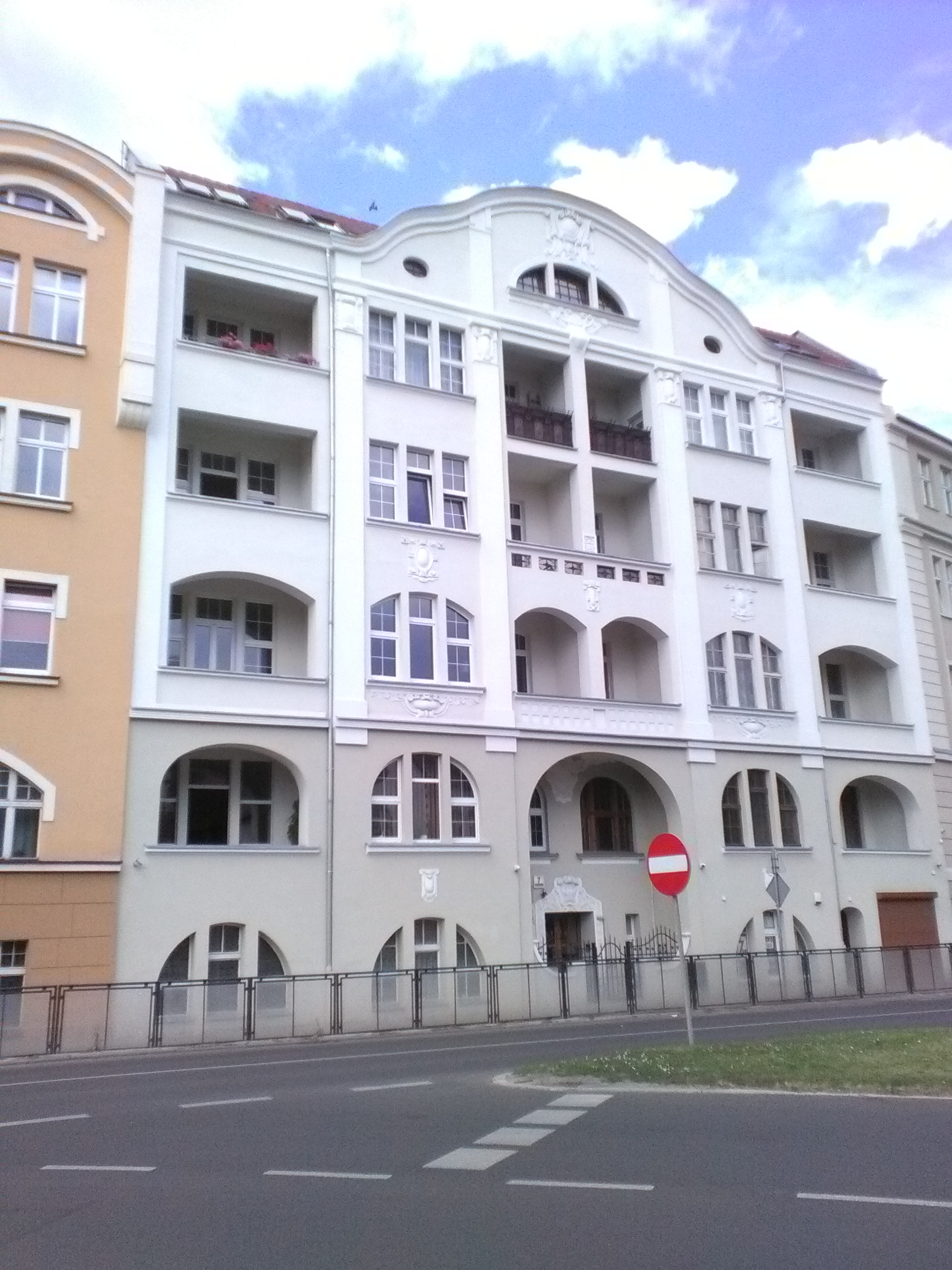
Main elevation

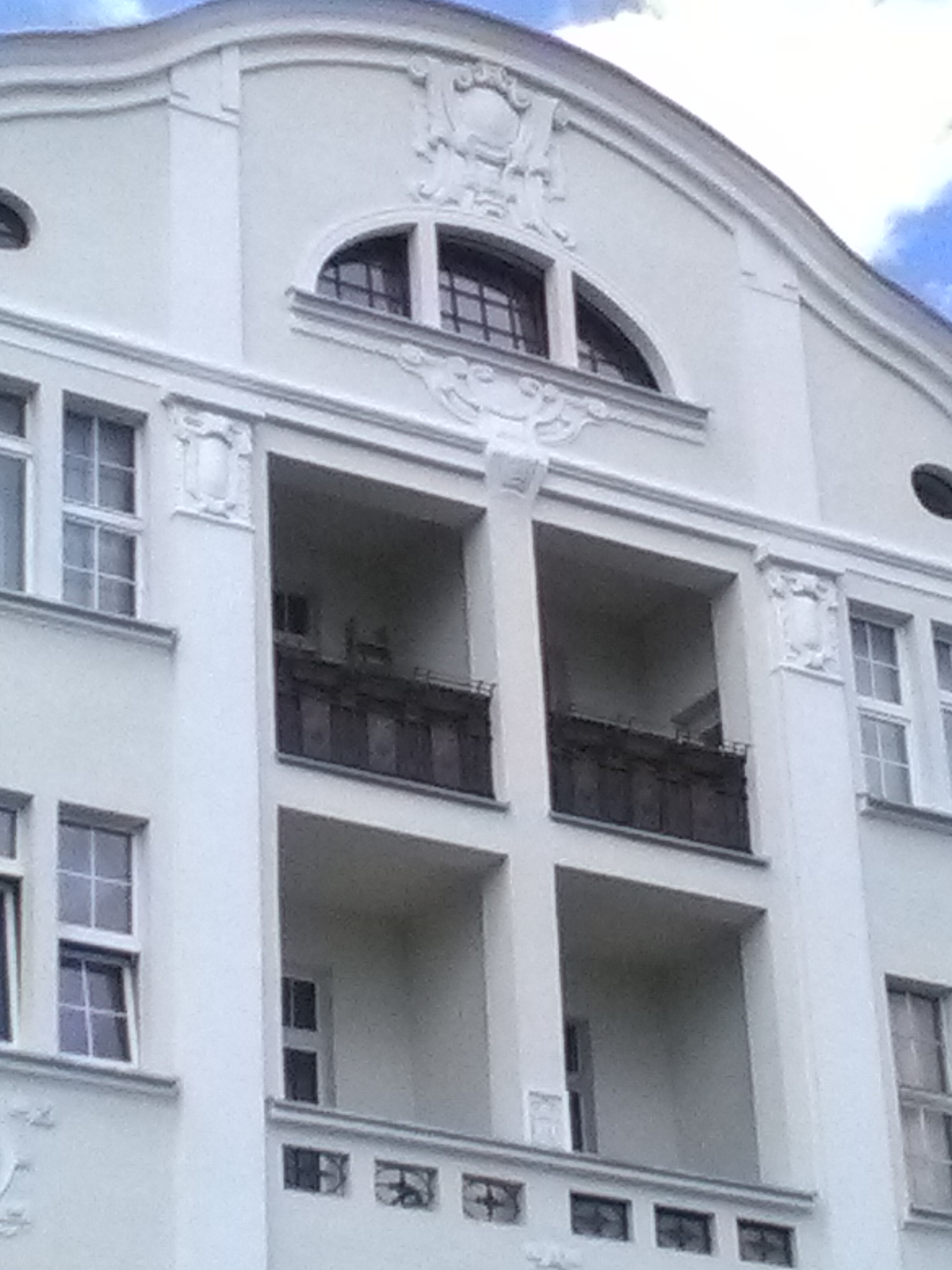
Detail of the curved pediment

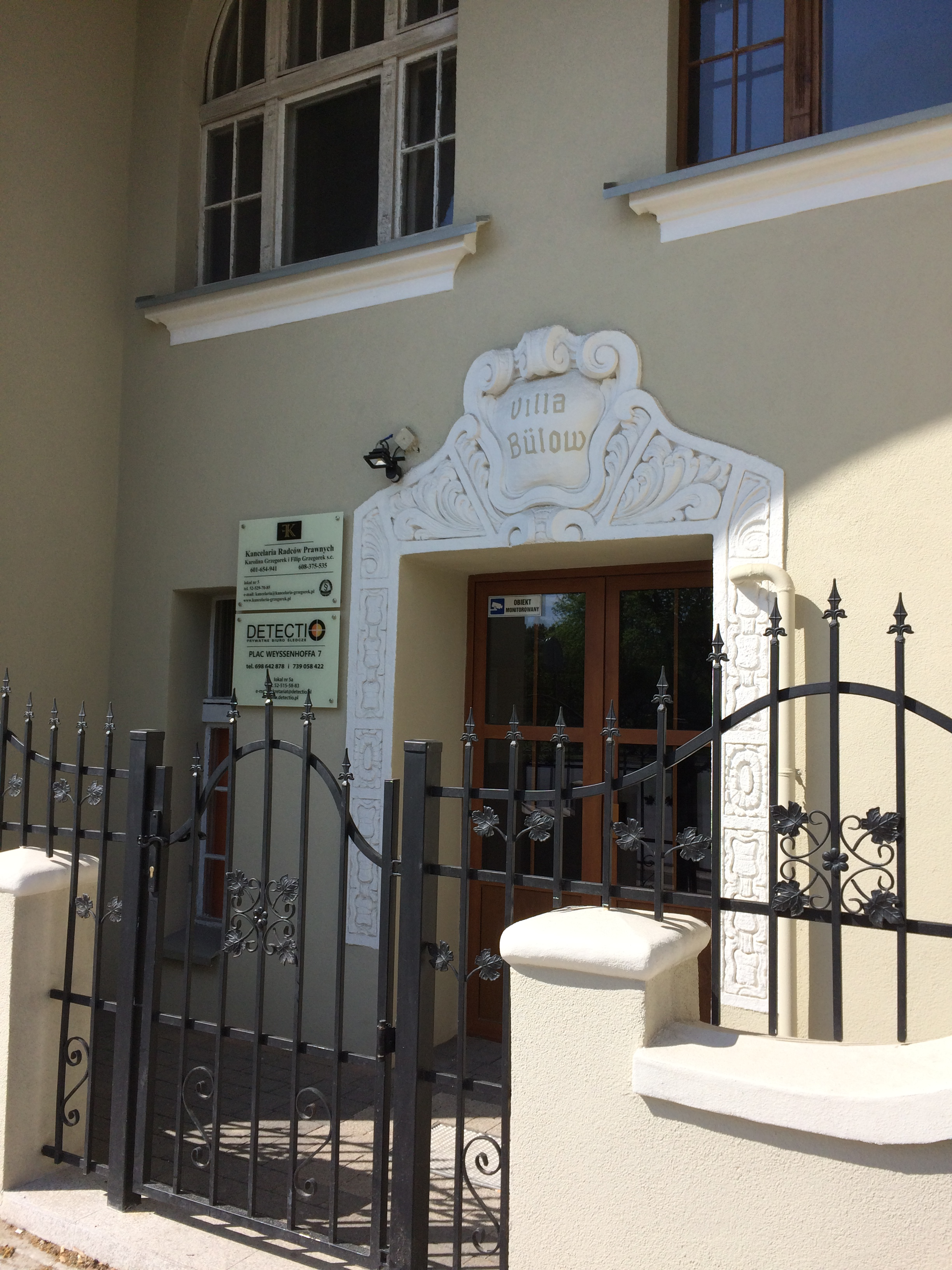
Main gate portal

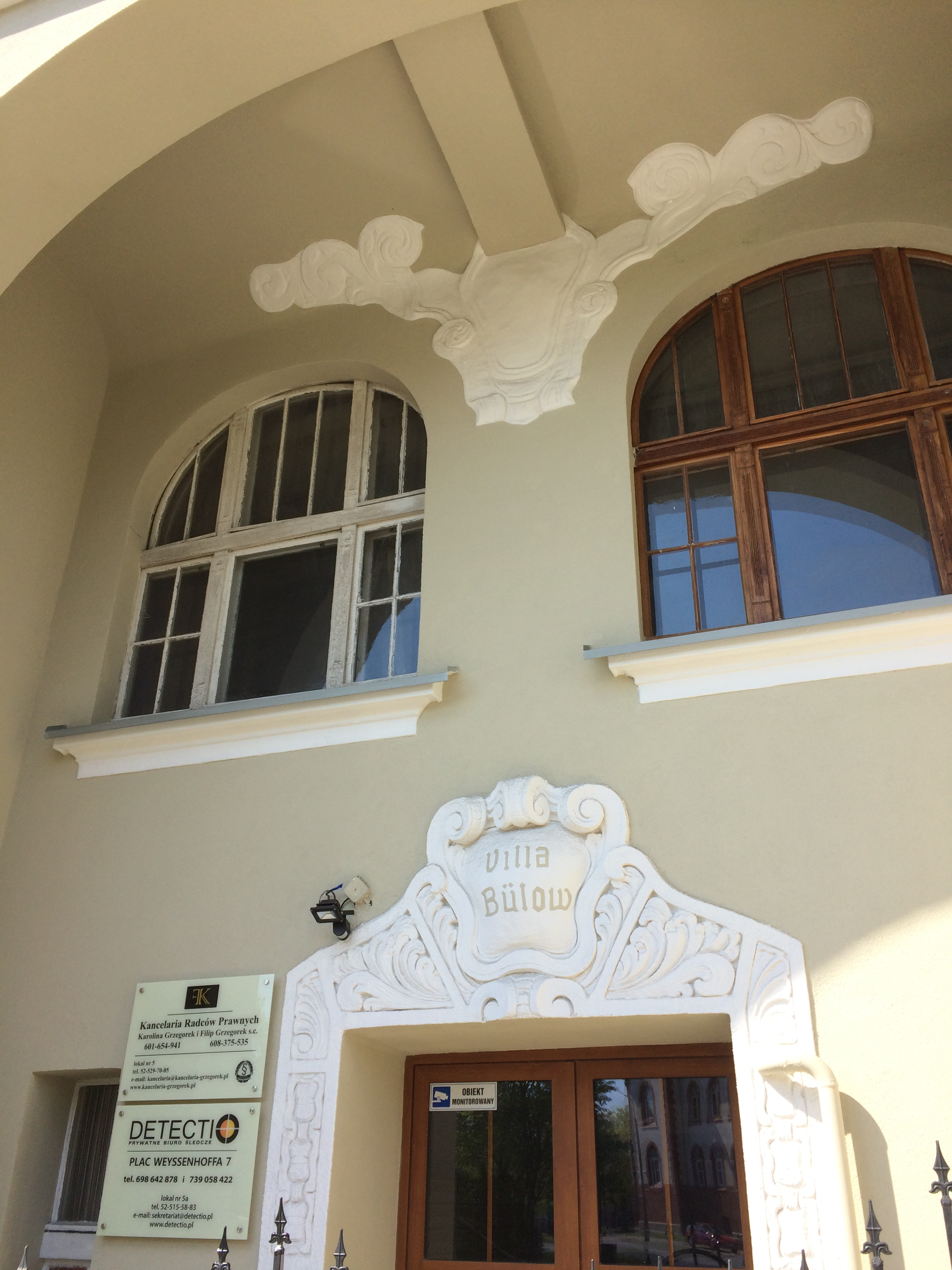
Adornement of the portal

=== Tenement at 9 Józef Weyssenhoff Square ===
Registered on Kuyavian-Pomeranian Voivodeship heritage list, Nr.725836-Reg.A/1522 (March 20, 2009)

1910–1911, by Georg Baesler

Art Nouveau

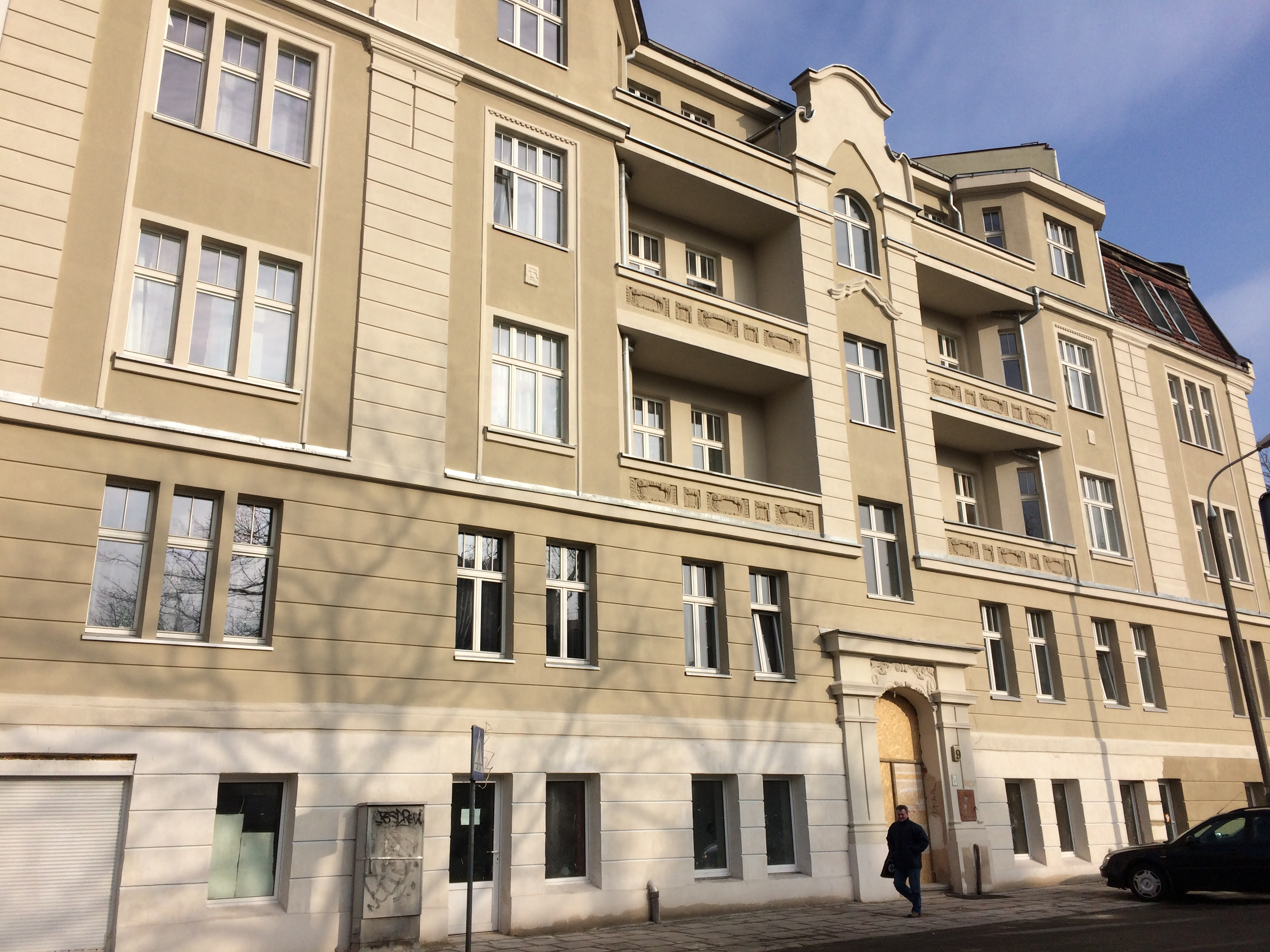
General view 2016

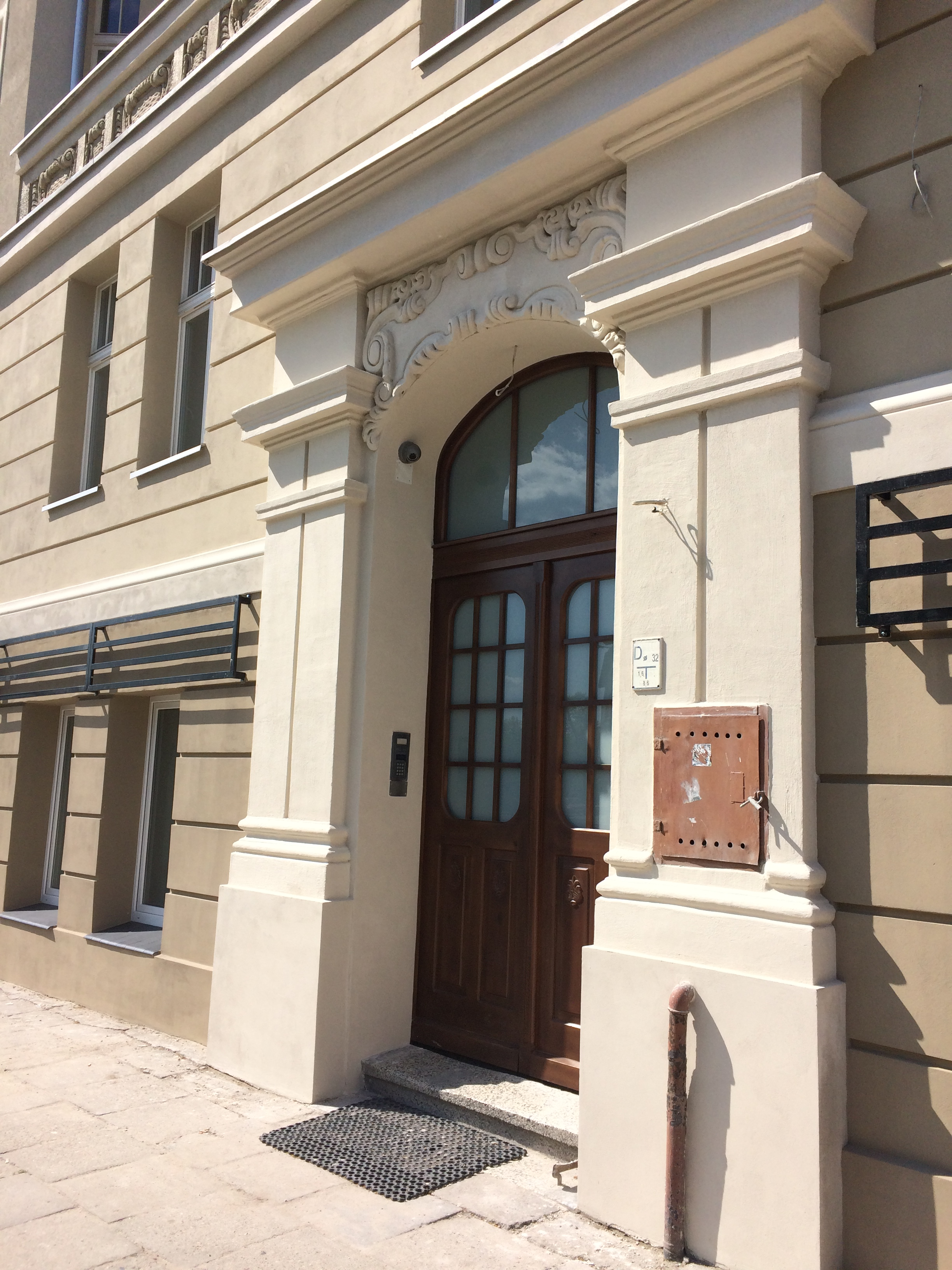
Detail of the entry gate

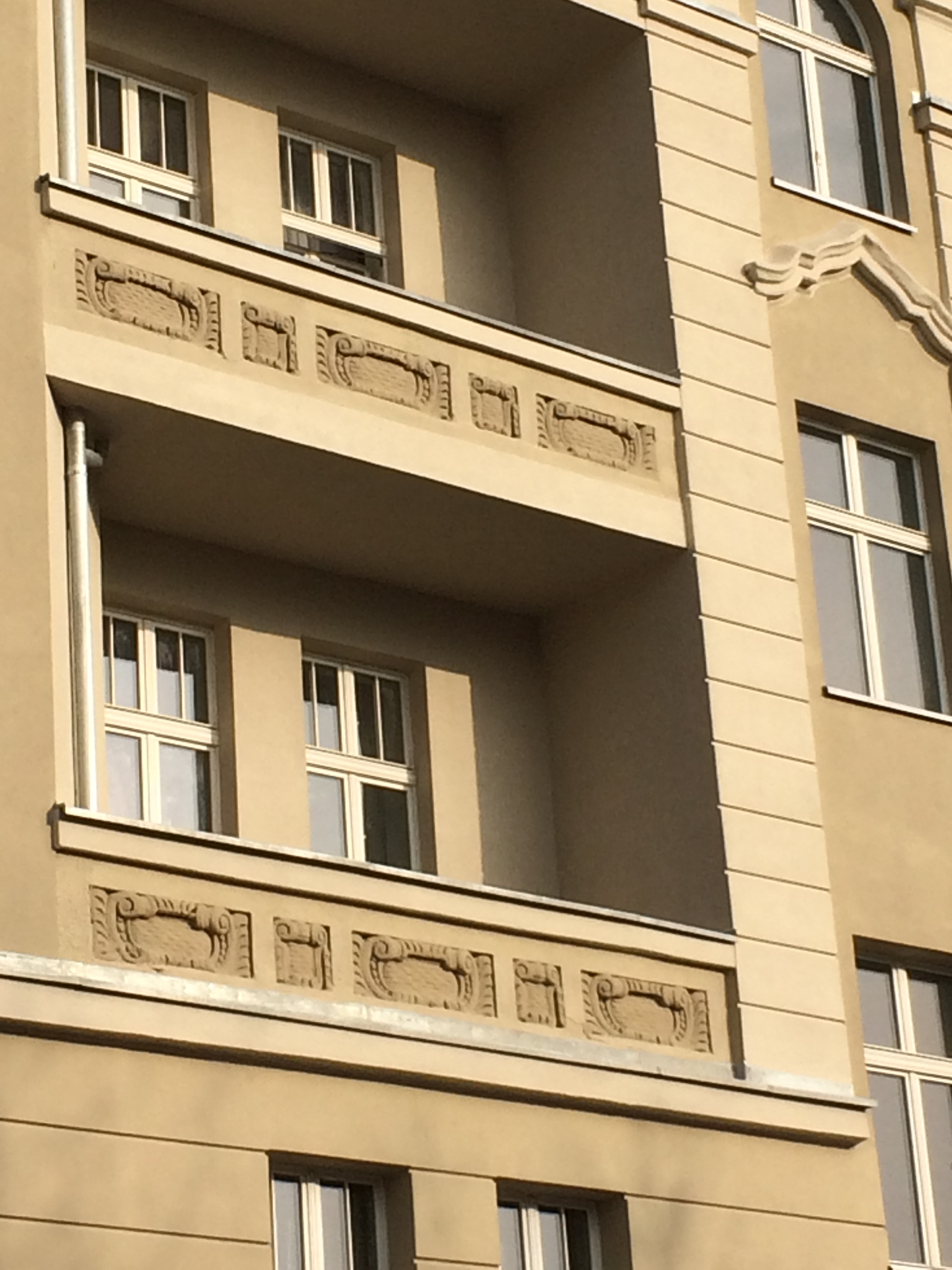
Motifs details

=== Building of the Institute of Agriculture ===
Registered on Kuyavian-Pomeranian Voivodeship heritage list, Nr.601254-Reg.A/676/1-8 (May 20, 1992)

Józef Weyssenhoff Square Nr.11

1903–1906, by H. Delius

Eclecticism

The architectural ensemble of the Institutes of Agriculture in Bydgoszcz occupies an area of 7.5 hectares, between J. Weyssenhoff Square, Ossolińsky Alley, Powstańców Wielkopolskich Alley and Karol Szymanowski Street. The western area is laid out with buildings, the eastern one is a 5 ha zone of field vegetation, with livestock, greenhouses and a barn.

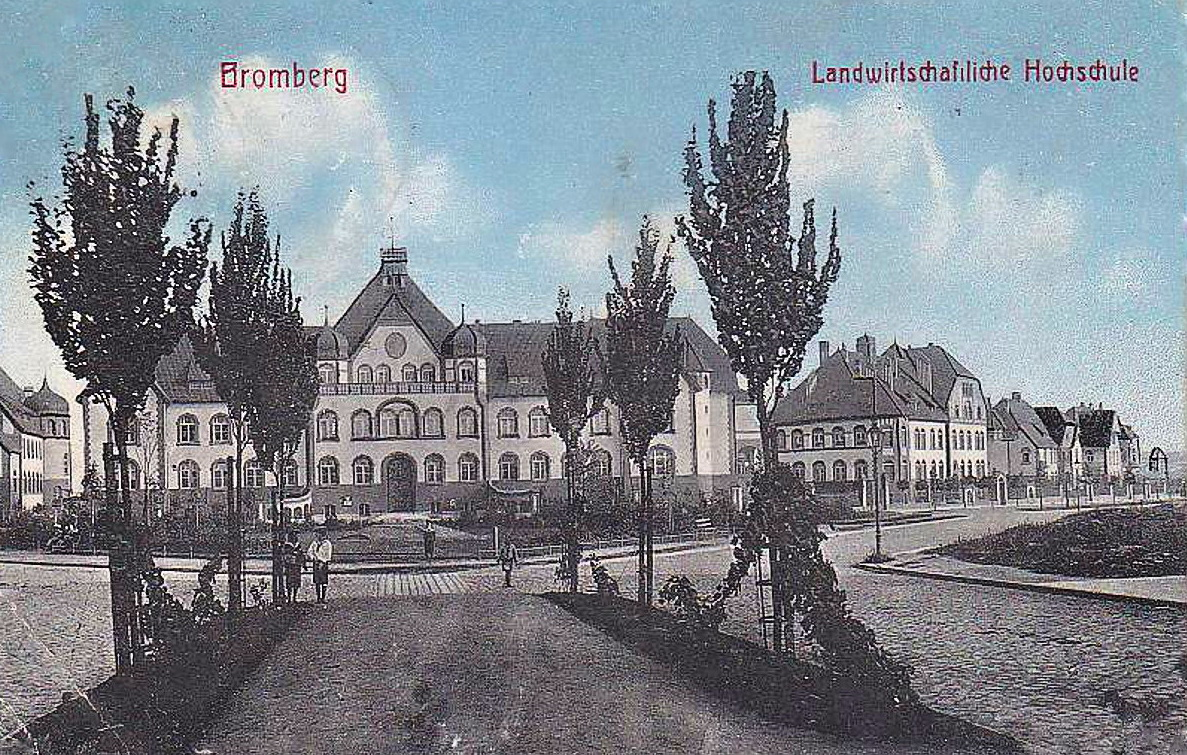
Institutes of Agriculture ca 1908

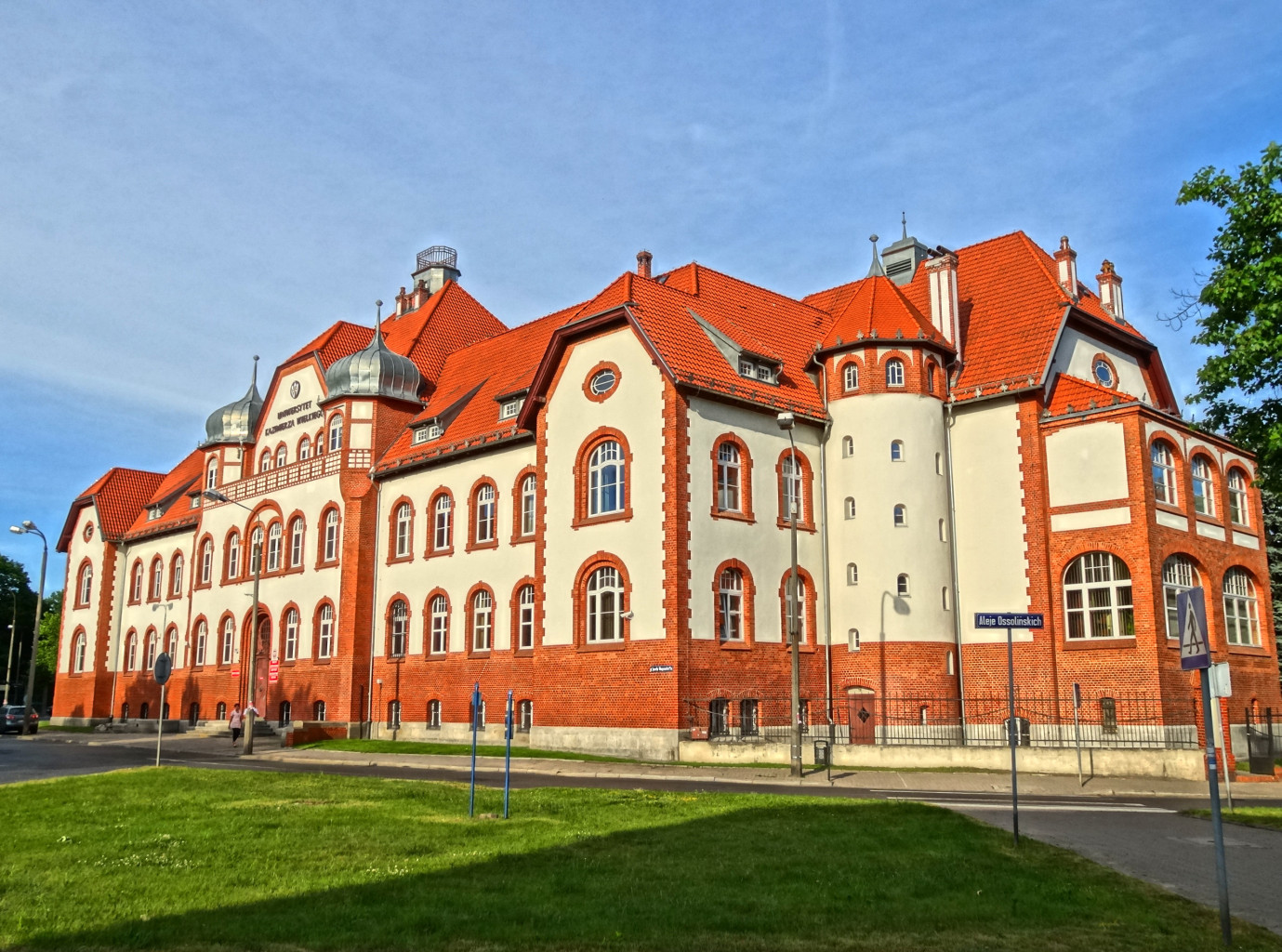
General view from Plac J. Weyssenhoff

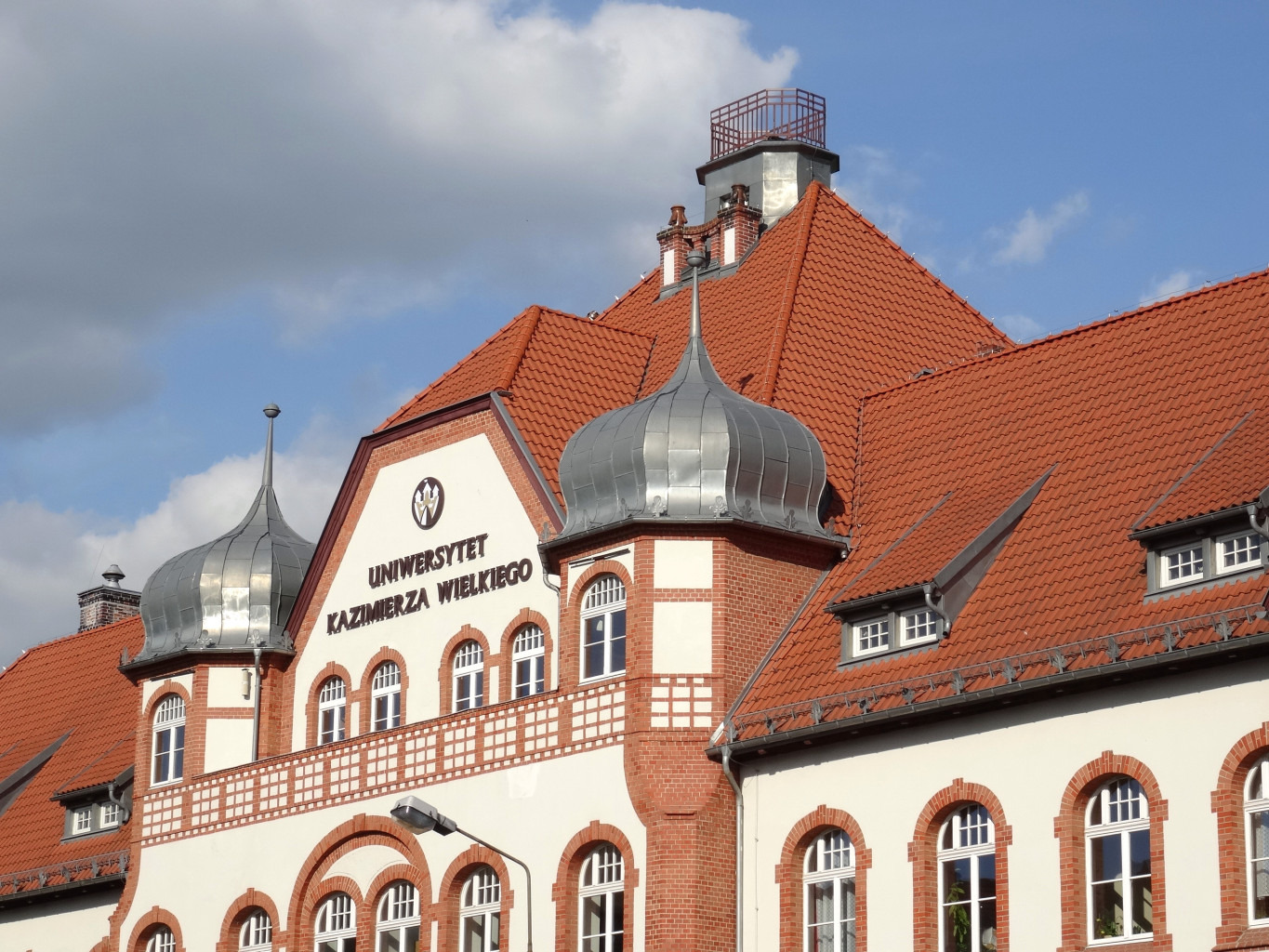
Main avant-corps with tin roof, the observatory on top

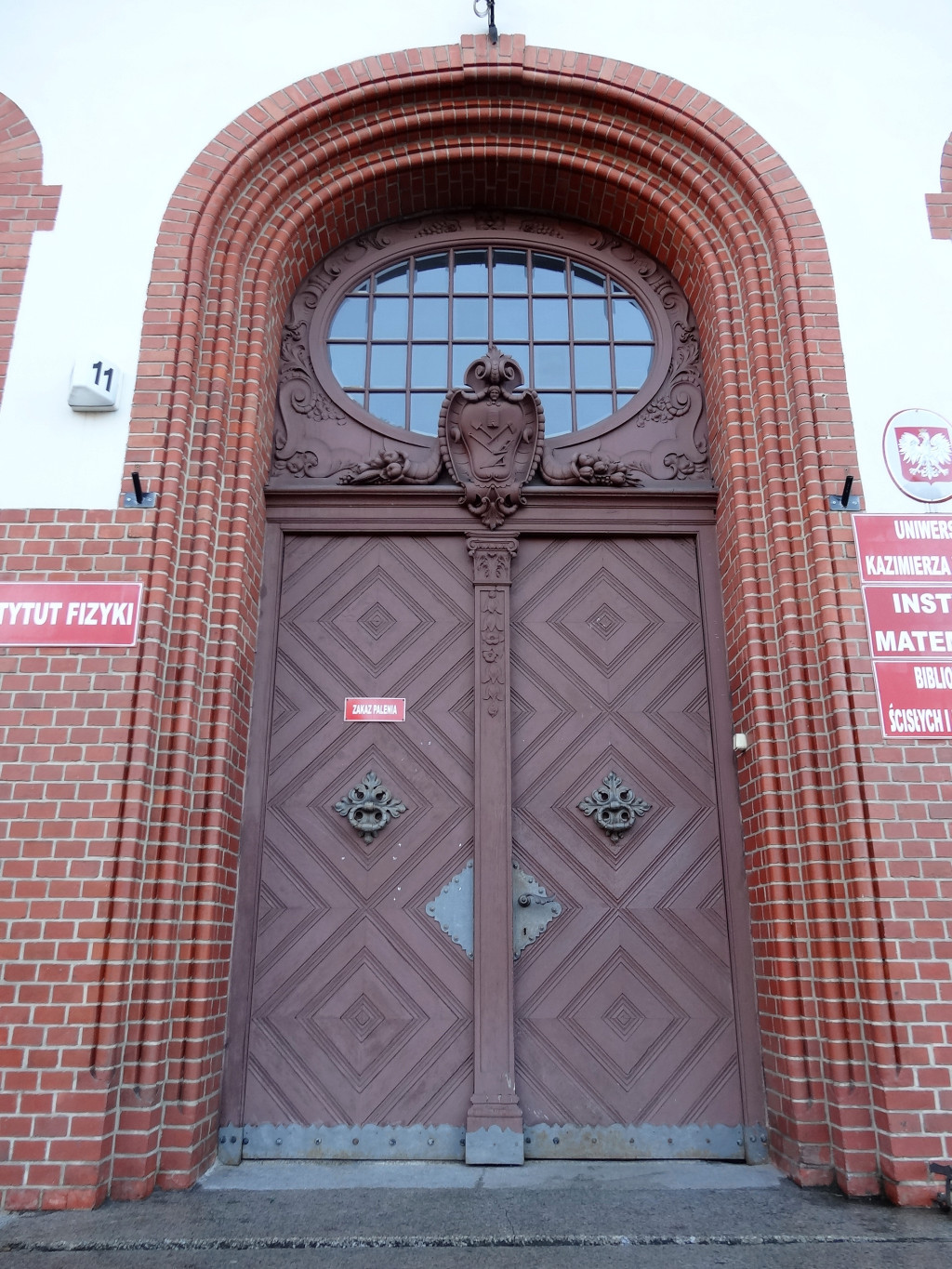
Main gate

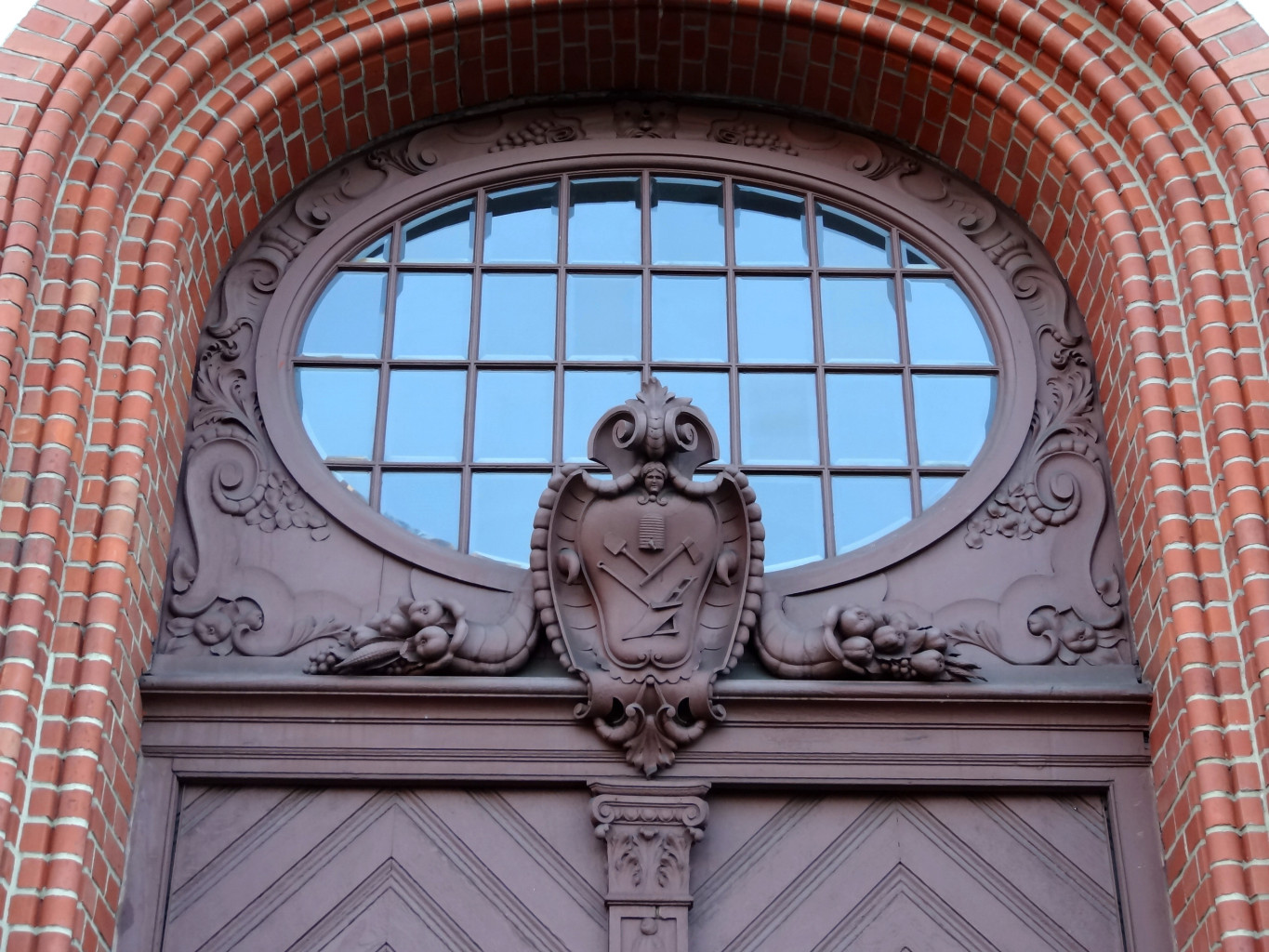
Transom light and its decorated cartouche
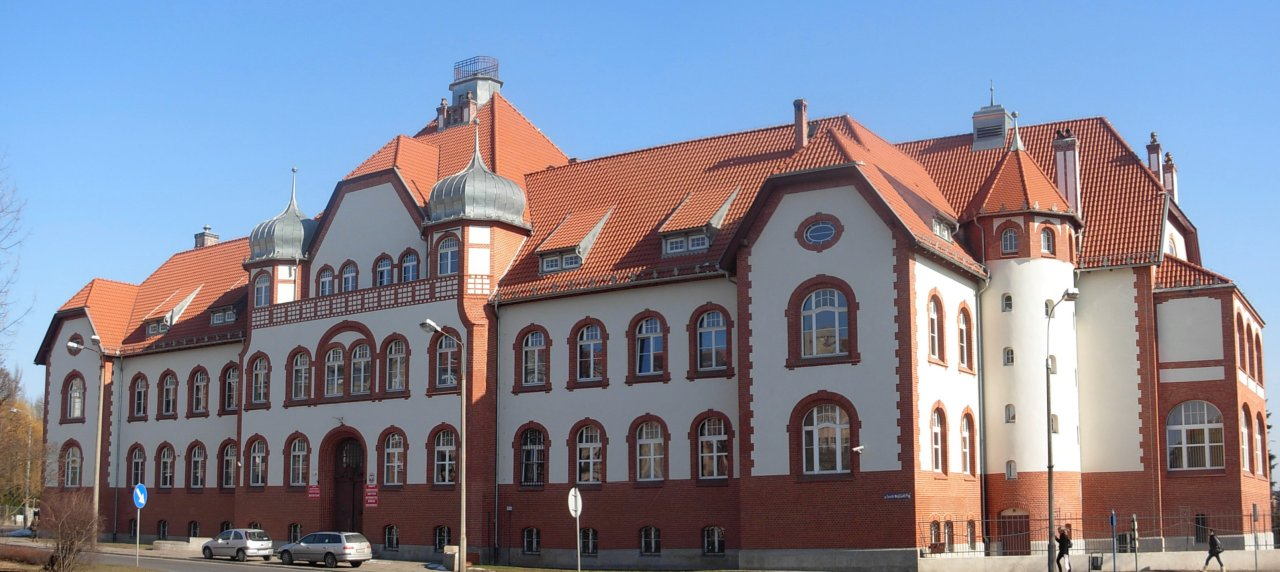
Panoramic view of Former building of the Institute of Agriculture

== Bibliography ==
- Bręczewska-Kulesza, Daria. Przegląd stylów występujących w bydgoskiej architekturze drugiej połowy XIX i początku XX stulecia (in Polish). Bydgoszcz.
- Jastrzębska-Puzowska, Iwona (2005). Od miasteczka do metropolii. Rozwój architektoniczny i urbanistyczny Bydgoszczy w latach 1850–1920 (in Polish). Toruń: Wydawnictwo MADO. ISBN 83-89886-38-3.
- Umiński, Janusz (1996). Bydgoszcz. Przewodnik (in Polish). Bydgoszcz: Regionalny Oddział PTTK. "Szlak Brdy".
- Czachorowski, Antoni (1997). Atlas historyczny miast polskich. Tom II Kujawy. Zeszyt 1. Bydgoszcz (in Polish). Toruń: Uniwersytet Mikołaja Kopernika.
- Kuczma, Rajmund (1995). AZieleń w dawnej Bydgoszczy (in Polish). Bydgoszcz: Instytut Wydawniczy "Świadectwo".
