= Henryk Weyssenhoff =

Polish-Belarusian landscape painter, illustrator and sculptor

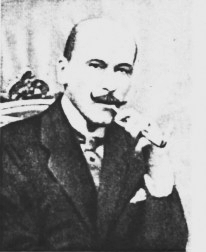
Henryk Weyssenhoff (date unknown)

Henryk Bonawentura Kazimierz Weyssenhoff (26 July 1859, Pakriaunys, Kovno Governorate - 23 July 1922, Warsaw) was a Polish landscape painter, illustrator and sculptor of Baltic-German ancestry.

== Biography ==
He was descended from an old family of the Livonian nobility. In 1863, his father was exiled to Siberia for his participation in the January Uprising. His mother followed with the family, as far as she could, and he grew up in the Urals. His first lessons in art were given to him there by Lucjan Kraszewski (brother of the writer Józef Ignacy Kraszewski), who was also living in exile.

In 1874, his father was pardoned, but they were not allowed to return to their old home, so they settled in Warsaw, where he studied painting with Wojciech Gerson. His work there attracted the attention of Henryk Siemiradzki who, in 1880, helped him gain admission to the Imperial Academy of Arts in Saint Petersburg. He graduated in 1885, earning a silver medal and the official title of "Artist" for his canvas "Transport of the Wounded". In 1889, he spent some time in Munich, improving his skills with Alfred Kowalski.

In 1900, he won another silver medal at the Exposition Universelle. As a result, from 1903 to 1904 he lived in Paris, then settled on his parents' estate near Pukhavichy, in what is now Belarus. During the First World War, he was forced to return to Warsaw and remained there until his death.

An avid hunter, many of his landscapes included animal life. In addition to his painting, he illustrated several works, notably two by his cousin, Józef Weyssenhoff; Erotyki (1911), a book of poetry, and Soból i Panna (1913), a novel that is loosely based on the manorial lifestyle of the Weyssenhoff family.

== Selected paintings ==
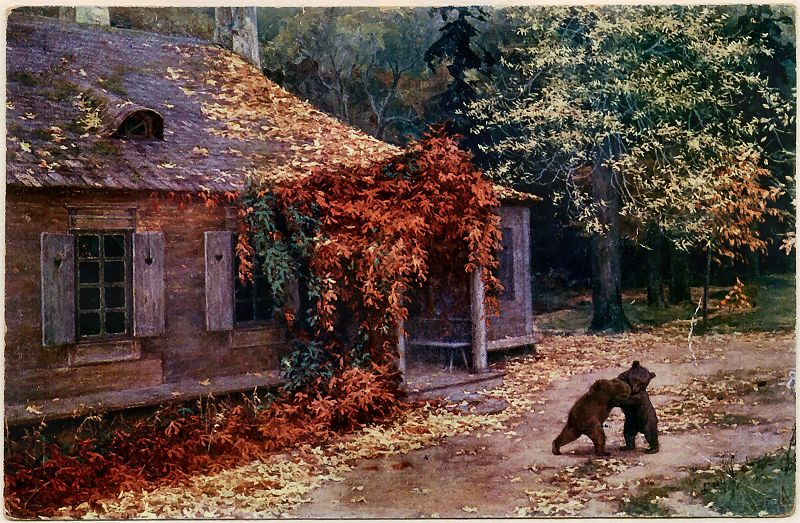
Bears Playing
in Front of a House

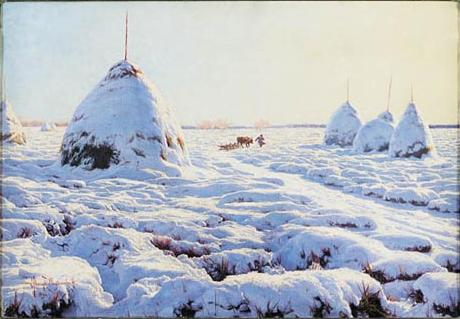
Snow

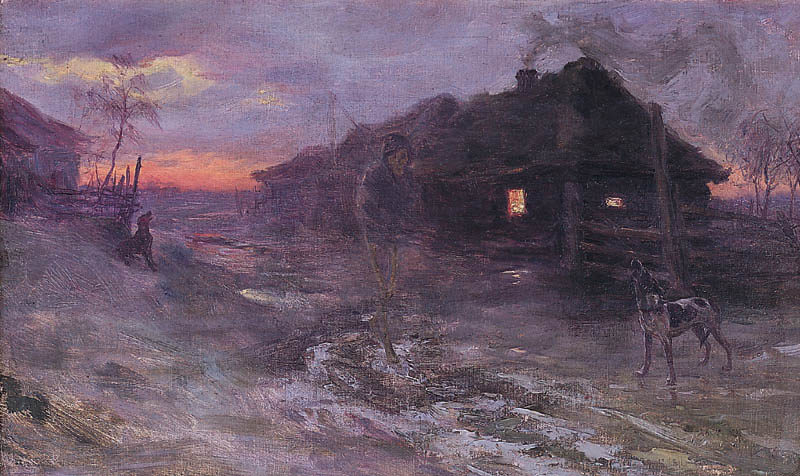
Premonition

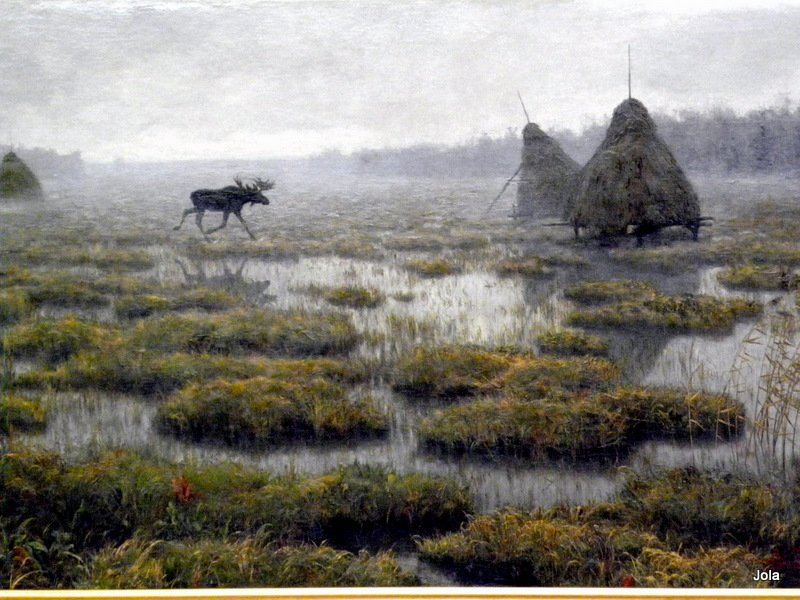
Moose in the Swamp
