= Kolano, Lublin Voivodeship =

Kolano
- Village
- Location within Poland
- Coordinates: 51°40′17″N 23°3′45″E
- Country: Poland
- Voivodeship: Lublin
- County: Parczew
- Gmina: Jabłoń
- Time zone: UTC+1 (CET)
  - Summer (DST): UTC+2 (CEST)

Kolano [kɔˈlanɔ] is a village in the administrative district of Gmina Jabłoń, within Parczew County, Lublin Voivodeship, in eastern Poland.

== History ==
13 Polish citizens were murdered by Nazi Germany in the village during World War II.
