= Kuchenne rewolucje =

- Genre: Reality television
- Directed by: Monika Lis; Danuta Urbanek; Daniel Banaczek; Alicja Chmielewska; Nikola Mihov; Aleksander Lewandowski
- Presented by: Magda Gessler
- Starring: Magda Gessler
- Theme music composer: Bartosz Tomaszek
- Country of origin: Poland
- Original language: Polish
- No. of seasons: 30
- No. of episodes: 405

Production
- Executive producers: Ulrich Brock; Piotr Fromowitz; Christoph Knechtel
- Producer: Constantin Entertainment (TVN - Season 1 - present)

Original release
- Network: TVN
- Release: March 6, 2010 – present

Related
- Ramsay's Kitchen Nightmares

Kuchenne rewolucje (Kitchen Revolutions) is a Polish reality television series broadcast on the TVN, in which Chef Magda Gessler is invited by the owners to spend 4 days with a failing restaurant in an attempt to revive the business. It is the Polish version of British Ramsay's Kitchen Nightmares.

== Ratings ==
List of ratings by series
Series	Episodes	Premiere timeslot	Series premiere	Series finale	TV season	Viewers	Average share (4+)	Average share (16-49)
1	8	Saturday 6:00 p.m.	6 March 2010	8 May 2010	Spring 2010	2 307 882	21,60%	25,84%
2	14	Saturday 6:00 p.m.	4 September 2010	11 December 2010	Autumn 2010	2 541 812	22,10%	28,18%
3	12	Saturday 6:00 p.m.	12 February 2011	30 April 2011	Spring 2011	2 873 755	23,96%	31,09%
4	14	Thursday 9:30 p.m.	8 September 2011	8 December 2011	Autumn 2011	2 788 804	21,05%	26,26%
5	14	Thursday 9:30 p.m.	1 March 2012	31 May 2012	Spring 2012	2 940 793	21,90%	26,92%
6	13	Thursday 9:30 p.m.	6 September 2012	November 29, 2012	Autumn 2012	2 622 936	19,76%	23,83%
7	15	Thursday 9:30 p.m.	28 February 2013	6 June 2013	Spring 2013	2 357 326	17,28%	20,75%
8	15	Thursday 9:30 p.m.	5 September 2013	12 December 2013	Autumn 2013	2 455 848	18,47%	22,68%
9	13	Thursday 9:30 p.m.	6 March 2014	29 May 2014	Spring 2014	2 517 337	18,26%	23,09%
10	13	Thursday 9:30 p.m.	4 September 2014	27 November 2014	Autumn 2014	2 281 424	16,51%	20,41%
11	13	Thursday 9:30 p.m.	5 March 2015	28 May 2015	Spring 2015	2 222 188	15,83%	20,44%
12	13	Thursday 8:50 p.m.	3 September 2015	26 November 2015	Autumn 2015	2 214 740	14,35%	19,69%
12	2	Thursday 9:30 p.m.	3 December 2015	10 December 2015	Autumn 2015	2 214 740	14,35%	19,69%
13	14	Thursday 9:30 p.m.	18 February 2016	19 May 2016	Spring 2016	2 071 446	15,14%	20,56%
14	14	Thursday 9:30 p.m.	1 September 2016	1 December 2016	Autumn 2016	2 158 692	15,83%	21,26%
14	1	Thursday 8:50 p.m.	1 September 2016	8 December 2016	Autumn 2016	2 158 692	15,83%	21,26%
15	14	Thursday 9:30 p.m.	16 February 2017	18 May 2017	Spring 2017	2 574 921	18,72%	25,25%
16	13	Thursday 9:30 p.m.	7 September 2017	30 November 2017	Autumn 2017	2 508 229	19,20%	25,51%
17	13	Thursday 9:30 p.m.	22 February 2018	25 May 2018	Spring 2018	2 417 321	18,24%	24,70%
18	13	Thursday 9:30 p.m.	6 September 2018	29 November 2018	Autumn 2018	2 254 475	16,93%	22,42%
18	1	Thursday 9:45 p.m.	6 September 2018	6 December 2018	Autumn 2018	2 254 475	16,93%	22,42%
19	13	Thursday 9:30 p.m.	28 February 2019	23 May 2019	Spring 2019	2 069 593	15,70%	21,48%
20	13	Thursday 9:30 p.m.	6 September 2019	28 November 2019	Autumn 2019	1 911 551	14,70%	19,59%
21	4	Thursday 9:30 p.m.	5 March 2020	26 March 2020	Spring 2020	1 835 555	14,50%	20,24%
21	13	Thursday 9:30 p.m.	3 September 2020	26 November 2020	Autumn 2020	1 835 555	14,50%	20,24%
22	15	Thursday 9:30 p.m.	14 January 2021	4 March 2021	Spring 2021	1 655 154	13,22%	18,52%
22	15	Thursday 9:30 p.m.	18 February 2021	27 May 2021	Spring 2021	1 655 154	13,22%	18,52%
23	15	Thursday 9:30 p.m.	2 September 2021	9 December 2021	Autumn 2021	1 568 884	13,74%	18,36%
24	13	Thursday 9:30 p.m.	3 March 2022	26 May 2022	Spring 2022	1 352 233	11,95%	15,80%
25	14	Thursday 9:30 p.m.	1 September 2022	1 December 2022	Autumn 2022	1 304 732	12,01%	15,89%
26	13	Thursday 9:30 p.m.	2 March 2023	25 May 2023	Spring 2023	1 295 864	11,81%	16,42%
27	12	Thursday 9:30 p.m.	7 September 2023	23 November 2023	Autumn 2023	1 082 940	10,09%	13,11%
28	12	Thursday 9:30 p.m.	7 March 2024	23 May 2024	Spring 2024	1 030 000	10,13%	12,99%
29	12	Thursday 9:30 p.m.	5 September 2024	21 November 2024	Autumn 2024	904 000	8,87%	
30	13	Thursday 8:50 p.m.	27 February 2025	22 May 2025	Spring 2025			

== Episodes ==
=== Season 1: Spring 2010 - Saturday 6 p.m. ===
#	#	Restaurant	Location	Original airdate	Official rating 4+	Share 4+	Share 16-49
1	1	Dziki Młyn (eng. Wild Mill)	Warsaw	March 6, 2010	2 407 644	18.54%	21.29%
2	2	Panorama	Gdańsk	March 13, 2010	2 673 402	21.84%	26.54%
3	3	Franc Josef	Katowice	March 20, 2010	2 580 264	21.94%	26.34%
4	4	Impuls	Łódź	March 27, 2010	2 594 951	23.10%	29.85%
5	5	Artemis ^{1}	Poznań	April 3, 2010	2 249 897	20.22%	22.30%
6	6	Pod Arsenałem (eng. Under Arsenal)	Toruń	April 24, 2010	1 749 993	20.51%	24.92%
7	7	U Zosi (eng. At Zosia)	Szczawnica	May 1, 2010	1 979 433	22.57%	27.90%
8	8	Grande Azzurro ^{2}	Warsaw	May 8, 2010	2 221 727	25.20%	29.36%

^1 Renamed Tawerna Kapetanias (eng. Tavern Kapetanias) during production
^2 Renamed Alpejska Polana (eng. Alpine Glade) during production

=== Season 2: Autumn 2010 - Saturday 6 p.m. ===
#	#	Restaurant	Location	Original airdate	Official rating 4+	Share 4+	Share 16-49
9	1	Pod Żaglami (eng. Under Sails)	Olsztyn	September 4, 2010	1 712 249	18.65%	21.66%
10	2	Jesz Burger	Lublin	September 11, 2010	1 613 978	1.80%	23.73%
11	3	Cinamon	Racibórz	September 18, 2010	2 245 258	23.33%	30.23%
12	4	Incognito Club / Restaurant ,,Weranda" (eng. Veranda Restaurant)	Mrozy	September 25, 2010	2 139 167	22.77%	31.69%
13	5	Wook and Roll / Bistro Orientalne Phi Long (eng. Phi Long Orient Bistro)	Warsaw	October 2, 2010	2 657 147	25.04%	33.76%
14	6	Zamkowa	Toruń	October 16, 2010	2 653 345	23.32%	30.08%
15	7	Restauracja Słowiańska (eng. Slavic Restaurant)	Słońsk	October 23, 2010	2 351 266	20.86%	26.30%
16	8	Broniszówka	Bronisze	October 30, 2010	2 418 278	21.21%	26.77%
17	9	Zamkowa	Świdwin	November 6, 2010	3 007 814	22.23%	27.81%
18	10	Paroles Paroles	Kraków	November 13, 2010	2 748 789	21.26%	26.97%
19	11	Zajazd Horolna (eng. Horolna Inn)	Przybędza	November 20, 2010	3 143 423	24.22%	32.21%
20	12	Czarcia Łapa (eng. Diabolical Paw)	Lublin	November 27, 2010	2 974 986	22.92%	29.27%
21	13	Tabun (eng. Flock)	Otomin	December 4, 2010	2 937 787	21.65%	25.93%
22	14	Tawerna Dominikańska (eng. Dominican Tavern)	Gdańsk	December 11, 2010	2 996 708	21.92%	27.47%

=== Season 3: Spring 2011 - Saturday 6 p.m. ===
#	#	Restaurant	Location	Original airdate	Official rating 4+	Share 4+	Share 16-49
23	1	Obrochtówka	Zakopane	February 12, 2011	3 195 561	23.86%	30.76%
24	2	Colloseum ^{5}	Tychy	February 19, 2011	3 211 330	23.82%	30.99%
25	3	Peper's	Białystok	February 26, 2011	3 154 825	22.52%	28.31%
26	4	Kuchnia i Wino (eng. Kitchen and Wine)	Pszczyna	March 5, 2011	3 047 857	22.84%	27.39%
27	5	Alechemik	Tomaszów Mazowiecki	March 12, 2011	2 836 598	22.70%	30.55%
28	6	Indian Ocean	Poznań	March 19, 2011	3 074 326	25.20%	32.92%
29	7	Maxim	Wieliczka	March 26, 2011	3 204 320	21.34%	27.36%
30	8	Valencia ^{6}	Warsaw	April 2, 2011	2 538 453	25.33%	33.49%
31	9	U Jędzy (eng. At Shrew) ^{7}	Kraków	April 9, 2011	2 919 339	25.76%	35.71%
32	10	Barcelonka	Przemyśl	April 16, 2011	2 619 900	28.36%	37.25%
33	11	Barbarossa ^{8}	Siedlce	April 23, 2011	2 354 132	22.48%	28.53%
34	12	Darjan Brydż ^{9}	Bystrzyca Kłodzka	April 30, 2011	2 327 283	26.30%	34.97%

^5 Renamed Pod Prosiakiem (eng. At the Piglets) during production
^6 Renamed U Samuela (eng. At Samuel) during production
^7 Renamed Edelweiss during production
^8 Renamed Róża (eng. Pink) during production
^9 Renamed Zielone Drzewo (eng. Green Tree) during production

=== Season 4: Autumn 2011 - Thursday 9.30 p.m. ===
#	#	Restaurant	Location	Original airdate	Official rating 4+	Share 4+	Share 16-49
35	1	Open Air ^{10}	Magdalenka	September 8, 2011	2 677 527	20.95%	26.16%
36	2	Steak House Rodeo	Kwidzyn	September 15, 2011	2 399 843	18.62%	23.88%
37	3	Panorama ^{11}	Nowogród	September 22, 2011	2 376 142	18.42%	23.21%
38	4	Penelopa	Inowrocław	September 29, 2011	2 436 333	18.61%	23.81%
39	5	Ania z Zielonego Wzgórza (eng. Anne of Green Gables) ^{12}	Tarnowskie Góry	October 6, 2011	2 710 417	20.60%	26.74%
40	6	Karczma przy Dworze (eng. Inn near Manor)	Jasionka	October 13, 2011	2 965 595	22.69%	28.15%
41	7	Braterska	Tarnów	October 20, 2011	2 689 979	20.14%	24.92%
42	8	Wei Heping	Warsaw	October 27, 2011	2 963 161	21.78%	25.46%
43	9	Stara Kuźnia (eng. Old Smithy)	Magnuszew	November 3, 2011	2 838 172	21.07%	25.92%
44	10	Galeria Smaku (eng. Gallery of Taste)	Kozienice	November 10, 2011	2 784 594	21.07%	26.97%
45	11	Stella Café *	Lębork	November 17, 2011	3 186 575	23.12%	29.43%
46	12	Karczma Nałęczowska	Nałęczów	November 24, 2011	2 801 136	21.05%	26.90%
47	13	Karczma Polany	Kościelisko	December 1, 2011	3 158 763	24.13%	28.28%
48	14	Zapiecek ^{13}	Poznań	December 8, 2011	3 054 213	22.22%	27.44%

^10 Renamed Ale Bajka (eng. What A Tale) during production
^11 Renamed Wiszące Ogrody nad Narwią (eng. Pendant Gardens over Narwią) during production
^12 Renamed Don Kichot during production
^13 Renamed Metka (eng. Meat Spreag) during production

- The restaurant Stella Cafe in 11 episode was closed before the final dinner because of the owner's debt. The bailiff closed the restaurant. Magda Gessler could not carry out the revolution for the first time in the history of the program. The restaurant would have been renamed "Springer"

=== Season 5: Spring 2012 - Thursday 9.30 p.m. ===
#	#	Restaurant	Location	Original airdate	Official rating 4+	Share 4+	Share 16-49
49	1	Kapitan Nemo (eng. Captain Nemo) ^{14}	Skarbimierz-Osiedle	March 1, 2012	2 583 409	19.30%	24.00%
50	2	Karczma u Bartka (eng. The Inn at Bartek) ^{15}	Bukowina Tatrzańska	March 8, 2012	2 785 364	20.90%	24.40%
51	3	Tawerna (eng. Tavern) ^{16}	Dobre Miasto	March 15, 2012	2 942 484	21.70%	27.50%
52	4	Syrenka (eng. Mermaid)	Ustka	March 22, 2012	2 711 309	21.30%	24.80%
53	5	Enigma ^{17}	Radom	March 29, 2012	2 868 062	20.70%	25.60%
54	6	Greek Zorbas	Augustów	April 5, 2012	3 263 040	23.40%	29.60%
55	7	Campo di Fiori ^{18}	Nowy Sącz	April 12, 2012	3 332 293	23.80%	28.40%
56	8	Samui	Kraków	April 19, 2012	3 155 701	23.30%	29.90%
57	9	Niebieski Parasol (eng. The Blue Umbrella) ^{19}	Chojnów	April 26, 2012	3 191 519	23.40%	28.80%
58	10	Hotel Corum ^{20}	Karpacz	May 3, 2012	2 804 102	21.90%	25.80%
59	11	Namaste India	Zielona Góra	May 10, 2012	2 907 099	22.10%	28.30%
60	12	Pałac Nieznanice (eng. Palace Nieznanice)	Nieznanice	May 17, 2012	2 957 808	21.60%	26.80%
61	13	Karczma pod Łosiem (eng. The Inn at the Moose) ^{21}	Wawrów	May 24, 2012	2 714 498	20.50%	25.70%
62	14	Fregata (eng. Frigate)	Koszalin	May 31, 2012	2 971 473	22.60%	27.10%

^14 Renamed Kapitan Kuk (eng. Captain Kuk) during production
^15 Renamed Kiełbacha i Korale (eng. Sausage and Corals) during production
^16 Renamed Bar Familijny (eng. Family bar) during production
^17 Renamed Pyszny Browar (eng. Delicious Brewery) during production
^18 Renamed Labolatorium Pizzy (eng. Vaboratory of Pizza) during production
^19 Renamed Pod Jeleniem (eng. Under At Deer) during production
^20 Renamed Śniadaniarnia (eng. Breakfast home) during production
^21 Renamed Farma Wawrzyńca (eng. Lawrence's Farm) during production

=== Season 6: Autumn 2012 - Thursday 9.30 p.m. ===
#	#	Restaurant	Location	Original airdate	Official rating 4+	Share 4+	Share 16-49
63	1	Kameralna (eng. Chamber)	Chodzież	September 6, 2012	2 532 906	19.77%	24.11%
64	2	Magnolia ^{22}	Gryfów Śląski	September 13, 2012	2 744 376	21.49%	25.43%
65	3	Leśna Chata (eng. Forest Cottage)	Kraszków	September 20, 2012	2 372 771	17.86%	21.86%
66	4	Łabędź (eng. Swan)	Pyskowice	September 27, 2012			
67	5	Antykwariat (eng. Antiquarian) ^{23}	Lublin	October 4, 2012			
68	6	Leo Libra ^{24}	Gniezno	October 11, 2012			
69	7	Kuźnia Smaków (eng. Smithy of Flavors) ^{25}	Bielsko-Biała	October 18, 2012			
70	8	Orient Express	Lublin	October 25, 2012			
71	9	Zajazd pod Jodłową Górą (eng. Inn under the Mountain fir)	Tymbark	November 1, 2012			
72	10	Matalmara ^{26}	Goczałkowice-Zdrój	November 8, 2012			
73	11	Karczma Leśniczanka	Wielbark	November 15, 2012			
74	12	Villa Toscania	Pszczew	November 22, 2012			
75	13	Gaumarjos	Warsaw	November 29, 2012			

^22 Renamed Obora (eng. Cowshed) during production
^23 Renamed Ąka during production
^24 Renamed Dziki Dwór Pod Kaczką (eng. Wild Manor At Duck) during production
^25 Renamed Trattoria da Tadeusz during production
^26 Renamed Willa pod złotym ziemniakiem (eng. Villa under the Golden Potato) during production

- The LeoLibra (episode 6, season 6) According to Magda Gessler, the worst restaurant before 9 episode, the 7th season. But in spite of this revolution ended a great success

=== Season 7: Spring 2013 - Thursday 9.30 p.m. ===
#	#	Restaurant	Location	Original airdate	Official rating 4+	Share 4+	Share 16-49
76	1	Folklor (eng. Folklore)	Jastrowie	February 28, 2013	2 482 217	18.09%	
77	2	Cieszyński Browar Mieszczański (eng. Cieszyn's brewery bourgeois)	Cieszyn	March 7, 2013			
78	3	Rybka (eng. Fish)	Gdańsk	March 14, 2013			
79	4	Nasza Chata Smaków (eng. Our cottage Tastes) ^{27}	Babi Dół	March 21, 2013			
80	5	Magistrat (eng. Magistrate)	Hrubieszów	March 28, 2013			
81	6	Marrone ^{28}	Ostrów Wielkopolski	April 4, 2013			
82	7	VooDoo ^{29}	Kielce	April 11, 2013			20.16%
83	8	Carska (eng. Tsarist)	Legionowo	April 18, 2013	2 513 301	18.39%	22.55%
84	9	Perła (eng. Pearl) ^{30}	Jasło	April 25, 2013			21.66%
85	10	Majaga ^{31}	Dębica	May 2, 2013			
86	11	Tawerna Ellada (eng. Tavern Ellada) ^{32}	Głogów	May 9, 2013			
87	12	Malinówka	Wisła	May 16, 2013			21.59%
88	13	Viki Lektiko ^{33}	Elbląg	May 23, 2013			
89	14	Bazylia & Oregano (eng. Basil & Oregano)	Poznań	May 30, 2013			16.63%
90	15	Stary kredens (eng. old Cupboard)	Sanok	June 6, 2013	2 604 277	19.39%	22.70%

^27 Renamed Schabowy... Raz! (eng. Chop ... Once !) during production
^28Renamed Golonka w Pepitkę (eng. Knuckle in Dogtooth Check) during production
^29Renamed American House during production
^30Renamed U Schabińskiej (eng. In Schabińskia) during production
^31Renamed U sióstr (eng. In Sisters) during production
^32 Renamed Viva Grecja (eng. Viva Greece) during production
^33Renamed Szprota (eng. Sprat) during production

- Perła (episode 9, season 7) According to Magda Gessler, the worst restaurant before 14 episode, 8th of the season. But in spite of this revolution ended a great success

=== Season 8: Autumn 2013 - Thursday 9.30 p.m. ===
#	#	Restaurant	Location	Original airdate	Official rating 4+	Share 4+	Share 16-49
91	1	U przyjaciół (eng. At friends)	Sopot	September 5, 2013	2 275 461	18,10%	22,40%
92	2	Do syta (eng. To fill) ^{34}	Łódź	September 12, 2013	2 339 479	18,30%	21.80%
93	3	U Wikinga (eng. At the Viking) ^{35}	Słupsk	September 19, 2013	2 291 730	18,00%	23.00%
94	4	Sielska Zagroda (eng. Sielska Farm)	Nowy Dwór Gdański	September 26, 2013	2 460 336	18,40%	21,30%
95	5	Relax ^{36}	Chełm	October 3, 2013	2 198 851	17,30%	21,50%
96	6	Euforia (eng. Euphoria)	Ciągowice	October 10, 2013	2 496 809	19,60%	24,70%
97	7	Mauritiana ^{37}	Nowy Targ	October 17, 2013	2 500 140	19,20%	23,60%
98	8	Parada (eng. Parade Inn) ^{38}	Kościerzyna	October 24, 2013	2 673 168	19,70%	25.50%
99	9	Imperium Smaku (eng. Empire of Taste) ^{39}	Łódź	October 31, 2013	2 484 768	17,50%	20,00%
100	10	Paradis ^{40}	Puck	November 7, 2013	2 356 154	17,40%	22.00%
101	11	Feniks (eng. Phoenix) ^{41}	Kobiór	November 14, 2013	2 741 720	20,10%	24.10%
102	12	Zajazd pod Kłobukiem (eng. Inn at Kłobuk)	Małdyty	November 21, 2013	2 465 418	18,10%	23,20%
103	13	Chata Paprocańska (eng. Cottage Paprocańska) ^{42}	Tychy	November 28, 2013	2 306 774	16,50%	20,10%
104	14	Tawerna (eng. Tavern) ^{43}	Warsaw	December 5, 2013	2 494 847	19,60%	24,00%
105	15	One Way ^{44}	Straszyn	December 12, 2013	2 727 560	19,40%	23,10%

^34Renamed Pod Jabłonką (eng. Under the Apple Tree) during production
^35Renamed Kurnik (eng. Henhouse) during production
^36Renamed Lwów (eng. Lviv) during production
^37Renamed Absynt during production
^38Renamed Bar Zigi during production
^39Renamed Gorąca Kiełbasiarnia (eng. Hot Sausage House) during production
^40Renamed Beka during production
^41Renamed Modra Pyza (eng. Deep-blue Kind of noodles) during production
^42Renamed Dom Bawarski (eng. Bavarian House) during production
^43 Renamed Ararat during production
^44Renamed Marilyn during production

- Tavern (episode 14, season 8) According to Magda Gessler, the worst restaurant before 3rd episode, 10th of the season. But in spite of this revolution ended a great success

=== Season 9: Spring 2014 - Thursday 9.30 p.m. ===
#	#	Restaurant	Location	Original airdate	Official rating 4+	Share 4+	Share 16-49
106	1	Łebska chata (eng. Łeba Cottage)	Łeba	March 6, 2014	2 410 221	17,50%	21,90%
107	2	Thai Spa & Restaurant ^{45}	Poznań	March 13, 2014	2 533 874	19,1%	23,9%
108	3	Black Jack ^{46}	Słupsk	March 20, 2014	2 623 452	18,7%	22,0%
109	4	Zajazd rudzki (eng. Rudzki Inn) ^{47}	Ruda Śląska	March 27, 2014	2 630 098	19,2%	24,2%
110	5	Zośka (eng. Sophy)	Zakopane	April 3, 2014	2 873 828	21,1%	27,0%
111	6	Italia ^{48}	Bielsko-Biała	April 10, 2014	2 274 507	16,3%	21,3%
112	7	Bistro pod aniołami (eng. Bistro at Angels) ^{49}	Nysa	April 17, 2014	2 640 752	18,99%	25,2%
113	8	La Costa ^{50}	Herby	April 24, 2014	2 593 511	18,9%	25,3%
114	9	Zajazd Pod Zamkiem (eng. Inn at the Castle)	Kętrzyn	May 1, 2014	2 320 599	16,7%	18,6%
115	10	Pizzeria OdNowa (eng. Pizzeria ReNewed) ^{51}	Bochnia	May 8, 2014	2 500 515	18,10%	22,2%
116	11	STOP Restaurant ^{52}	Białogard	May 15, 2014	2 428 536	17,2%	19,8%
117	12	La Torre ^{53}	Miłakowo	May 22, 2014	2 373 959	17,8%	23,3%
118	13	Villa "Bianco" ^{54}	Wrocław	May 29, 2014	2 517 710	17,9%	24,9%

^45Renamed Pad Thai during production
^46Renamed Ciao Ciao! during production
^47Renamed Bufet rulandia (eng. Buffet Rulandia) during production
^48Renamed Casa di Fulvio Maria Viola during production
^49Renamed Madame during production
^50Renamed Bistro Bochenek (eng. Bistro Loaf) during production
^51Renamed Chleb & Sól (eng. Bread & Salt) during production
^52Renamed Bistro Jajo (eng. Egg Bistro) during production
^53Renamed Mee...lina Bar during production
^54Renamed Steak & Lobster during production

=== Season 10: Autumn 2014 - Thursday 9.30 p.m. ===
#	#	Restaurant	Location	Original airdate	Official rating 4+	Share 4+	Share 16-49
119	1	Gościniec myśliwski (eng. Hunting highway)	Gdańsk	September 4, 2014	2 299 241	16,73%	22,79%
120	2	Bufet Country	Kobiór	September 11, 2014	2 109 822	15,04%	18,53%
121	3	Millennium ^{55}	Tczew	September 18, 2014	1 900 046	13,52%	16,94%
122	4	Jurand Inn ^{56}	Egiertowo	September 25, 2014			19,02%
123	5	Sekrety Buska (eng. Secrets of Busko)	Busko-Zdrój	October 2, 2014			20,99%
124	6	El Mundo ^{57}	Gdańsk	October 9, 2014			19,94%
125	7	Gęsia Szyja (eng. Goose Neck) ^{58}	Chełm	October 16, 2014	2 383 789	17,27%	22,78%
126	8	Szachownica (eng. Checkerboard) ^{59}	Poznań	October 23, 2014			18,27%
127	9	Rancho pod strusiem (eng. The ostrich ranch)	Bielsko-Biała	October 30, 2014			20,12%
128	10	Karczma Śląska (eng. Silesia Inn) ^{60}	Dąbrowa Górnicza	November 6, 2014			21,78%
129	11	Restauracja Cechowa (eng. Restaurant Features)	Złotów	November 13, 2014	2 505 918	17,83%	20,12%
130	12	China Food ^{61}	Grajewo	November 20, 2014			21,35%
131	13	Imperium (eng. Empire) ^{62}	Przasnysz	November 27, 2014	2 799 556	20,10%	

^55Renamed Mio Angeli during production
^56Renamed Przystanek Łosoś (eng STOP Salmon) during production
^57Renamed Pod cielakiem (eng. At the Calve) during production
^58Renamed Gęsie Sprawki (eng. Goose Doings) during production
^59Renamed Francja Elegancja (eng. France Elegance) during production
^60Renamed Pyza Śląska (eng. Kind of noodles Silesia) during production
^61Renamed Pierożkarnia (eng. Dumpling) during production
^62Renamed Długi Wąż (eng. Long Snake) during production

- Millennium (episode 3, season 10) According to Magda Gessler, so far the worst restaurant in the history of Kitchen Revolution. But in spite of this revolution ended a great success.

=== Season 11: Spring 2015 - Thursday 9.30 p.m. ===
#	#	Restaurant	Location	Original airdate	Official rating 4+	Share 4+	Share 16-49
132	1	La Cubanita ^{63}	Sandomierz	March 5, 2015	2 254 892	16,11%	20,76%
133	2	West End ^{64}	Piła	March 12, 2015	2 319 356	16,55%	21,38%
134	3	Pod Złotym Aniołem (eng. At the Gold Angel)	Bolesławiec	March 19, 2015	2 324 315	16,97%	20,74%
135	4	U'Bares	Rzeszów	March 26, 2015			22,29%
136	5	Stary Browar (eng. Old Brewery)	Świdnica	April 2, 2015			19,94%
137	6	Młyn (eng. Mill)	Bytom	April 9, 2015			17,88%
138	7	Polskie Ranczo (eng. Polish Rancho)	Bestwinka	April 16, 2015			20,31%
139	8	Remus ^{65}	Borowo	April 23, 2015			21,80%
140	9	Polski Smak (eng. Polish Taste) ^{66}	Katowice	April 30, 2015			20,11%
141	10	Dzikie Wino (eng. Wild Wine) ^{67}	Reda	May 7, 2015	2 344 843	16,83%	21,87%
142	11	Filmowa (eng. Movie) ^{68}	Kamieniec Wrocławski	May 14, 2015	2 387 663	16,75%	21,06%
143	12	Figaro ^{69}	Elbląg	May 21, 2015			18,22%
144	13	Zielarnia	Olsztynek	May 28, 2015	2 367 130	16,42%	19,89%

^63Renamed Casa de Locos during production
^64Renamed Lemon Capri during production
^65Renamed Sielawka during production
^66Renamed Bar Urlop (eng. Bar Leave) during production
^67Renamed Świnka i Rybka (eng. Mumps and Fish) during production
^68Renamed Hej Sokoły (eng. Hey Falcons) during production
^69Renamed Duchówka during production

=== Season 12: Autumn 2015 - Thursday 8.50 p.m. ===
#	#	Restaurant	Location	Original airdate	Official rating 4+	Share 4+	Share 16-49
145	1	Czardasz (eng. Chardash)	Gdańsk	September 3, 2015	1 930 313	12,77%	16,58%
146	2	Tbilisi	Warsaw	September 10, 2015	2 007 132	13,54%	18,23%
147	3	Good Father ^{70}	Katowice	September 17, 2015	2 239 745	15,02%	20,89%
148	4	Charlie’s ^{71}	Nowy Dwór Mazowiecki	September 24, 2015			21,62%
149	5	Karczma Górecka (eng. Górecka Inn) ^{72}	Brenna	October 1, 2015			19,09%
150	6	Gusto ^{73}	Piaseczno	October 8, 2015			
151	7	U Dunina ^{74}	Piotrków Trybunalski	October 15, 2015			19,19%
152	8	Berhida ^{75}	Sanok	October 22, 2015			
153	9	Dymarka ^{76}	Łańcut	October 29, 2015			17,54%
154	10	Boczek i spółka (eng. Bacon and company) ^{77}	Jelcz-Laskowice	November 5, 2015	2 542 844	15,89%	21,33%
155	11	Relax ^{78}	Bielsko-Biała	November 12, 2015			22,11%
156	12	Gospoda (eng. Inn) ^{79}	Gubin	November 19, 2015	2 637 480	16,55%	22,96%
157	13	Bistro Obora (eng. Bistro Cowshed) ^{80}	Zielonki	November 26, 2015	2 488 712	15,54%	21,71%
158	14	El Torro	Łódź	December 3, 2015			21,50%
159	15	El Fuego ^{81}	Rąbień	December 10, 2015			21,22%

^70Renamed Bistro Bzik (eng. Bistro Craze) during production
^71Renamed Charlie’s Star during production
^72Renamed Owce i Róże (eng. Sheep and Pinks) during production
^73Renamed La Bambola during production
^74Renamed Krochmal (eng. Starch) during production
^75Renamed Sowa Nasza Kasza (eng. Owl Our Groats) during production
^76Renamed Wypas during production
^77Renamed Chrup Chrup Kartofel (eng. Crunch Crunch Spud) during production
^78Renamed Batory during production
^79Renamed Dzika Świnia (eng. Wild Pig) during production
^80Renamed Zajezdnia (eng. Shed) during production
^81Renamed Kolorowe Gary (eng. Colourful Pots) during production

=== Season 13: Spring 2016 - Thursday 9.30 p.m. ===
#	#	Restaurant	Location	Original airdate	Official rating 4+	Share 4+	Share 16-49
160	1	Bar u Marka (eng. At Mark's Bar) / Kugel	Knyszyn	February 18, 2016	2 146 566	15,45%	20,95%
161	2	Mazowianka (en. Mazovian) / Zwyczajna (en. Ordinary)	Mińsk Mazowiecki	February 25, 2016	2 288 582	16,63%	21,80%
162	3	Aramia	Szczecin	March 3, 2016	1 955 014	14,03%	19,34%
163	4	U Wiencka (eng. At Wiencka) / Uncle Michael Restaurant	Komorów	March 10, 2016	2 113 999	15,32%	21,12%
164	5	Kaskada smaku (eng. Cascade of taste) / Zawijane Bistro (en. Wrapped up Bistro)	Pruszcz Gdański	March 17, 2016	1 997 958	15,13%	21,02%
165	6	L’amore / Grande Cozze ( en. Grand Goat)	Kielce	March 24, 2016	1 835 145	13,10%	17,05%
166	7	Salon kulinarny (eng. Culinary lounge) / Abażur (en. Lamp-Shade)	Warsaw	March 31, 2016	2 136 079	15,63%	21,27%
167	8	Pizzeria Kwadrans (eng. A quarter Pizzeria) / Zapiekane (en. Roasted)	Brzeziny	April 7, 2016	1 980 440	14,76%	20,17%
168	9	Karczma Sidło / Śledzik (en. Herring)	Żukowo	April 14, 2016	2 292 554	16,86%	23,84%
169	10	Pablo Picasso / Pod Gołąbkiem (en. Under Pigeon)	Rzeszów	April 21, 2016	2 016 689	15,16%	21,44%
170	11	Juran / Oberża Żar (en. Heat Inn)	Dąbrowa Górnicza	April 28, 2016	2 061 615	15,37%	20,08%
171	12	Jadłodajnia Bartosz (eng. Eating-house Bart) / Wyszynk z Szynką (eng. Retail of liquor from Ham) CLOSED WITH Hospital	Kielce	May 5, 2016	2 251 196	16,49%	22,26%
172	13	Papalina	Warsaw	May 12, 2016	1 975 273	14,21%	18,83%
173	14	Ognisty Smok (eng. Fiery Dragon) / Phuć Phuć	Lubartów	May 19, 2016	1 924 453	13,82%	19,02%

^93Renamed Phúc Phúc during production

=== Season 14: Autumn 2016 - Thursday 9.30 p.m. ===
#	#	Restaurant	Location	Original airdate	Official rating 4+	Share 4+	Share 16-49
174	1	Piekielna Kuchnia (eng. Hell's Kitchen) / Nie bo mleczne (eng. No, because it's milk)	Wałbrzych	September 1, 2016	2 011 279	15,19%	21,04%
175	2	Szalotka (eng. Shallot) / Szarlotka z Rumieńcem	Łagów	September 8, 2016	1 766 666	14,11%	17,81%
176	3	Montenegro	Łódź	September 15, 2016	1 589 000	12,34%	17,42%
177	4	Karczma Styrnol (eng. Styrnol Inn) / Dzika Chata	Zawoja	September 22, 2016			19,44%
178	5	Cynamon (eng. Cinnamon) / Słoneczna miska	Skrzynki, Masovian Voivodeship	September 29, 2016			22,47%
179	6	Blue Moon	Wałcz	October 6, 2016	2 390 781	17,33%	22,59%
180	7	Domowy Zakątek (eng. Corner Home) / Prawdziwa Knajpka	Lwówek	October 13, 2016			21,79%
181	8	Bistro Oliwka (eng. Bistro Olive) / Bistro ,,La Rosa''	Łódź	October 20, 2016			20,75%
182	9	Bar Na Szybkiej (eng. Bar On Quick) / Przystanek Wrocek	Wrocław	October 27, 2016			23,43%
183	10	Stacja Kościelniki (eng. Kościelniki Station) / Gęś na Jaśku	Kościelniki Górne	November 3, 2016			21,90%
184	11	Garnuszek (eng. Little mug) / Twoja Kolejka	Łodygowice	November 10, 2016			19,02%
185	12	Trzy Smaki (eng. Three Tastes) / Cała Wstecz	Czeladź	November 17, 2016			21,77%
186	13	Chata Po Zbóju (eng. Hut After Thug) / Pyszna Stajenka	Bąków	November 24, 2016	2 583 834	18,96%	25,34%
187	14	Karczma Cykada (eng. Cicada Inn) / Gość w Dom	Chlastawa	December 1, 2016			20,75%
188	15	Karczma Zamczysko (eng. Castle Inn) / Bistro na Fali	Malbork	December 8, 2016	2 432 022	16,06%	20,96%

=== Season 15: Spring 2017 - Thursday 9.30 p.m. ===
#	#	Restaurant	Location	Original airdate	Official rating 4+	Share 4+	Share 16-49
189	1	Lawendowy Dom (eng. Lavender House) ^{106}	Czeladź	February 16, 2017	2 195 495	15,69%	18,34%
190	2	Pizzeria Solare ^{107}	Biała Podlaska	February 23, 2017	2 540 380	18,50%	25,34%
191	3	Zajazd w Strażnicy (eng. Watch Tower Inn) ^{108}	Ujsoły	March 2, 2017	2 631 874	18,92%	26,70%
192	4	Szafran (eng. Saffron) ^{109}	Łódź	March 9, 2017	2 323 548	17,01%	22,37%
193	5	Restauracja Rodzinna (eng. Family Restaurant) ^{110}	Lublin	March 16, 2017	2 617 997	19,71%	27,90%
194	6	Italian House ^{111}	Toruń	March 23, 2017	2 625 446	19,09%	27,52%
195	7	Przedzamcze ^{112}	Sztum	March 30, 2017	3 001 564	21,12%	29,95%
196	8	Zajazd u Stefana (eng. Stefan Inn) ^{113}	Odolanów	April 6, 2017	2 568 706	18,61%	24,64%
197	9	Na Skarpie (eng. On Slope) ^{114}	Radziejów	April 13, 2017	2 606 300	18,33%	23,38%
198	10	Rammer Jammer ^{115}	Głogówek	April 20, 2017	2 463 931	17,69%	24,31%
199	11	Bar na Stawkach (eng. Bar on Rates) ^{116}	Ostrowiec Świętokrzyski	April 27, 2017	2 678 649	16,25%	27,29%
200	12	Lizawka	Poznań	May 4, 2017	2 798 145	19,97%	28,33%
201	13	Bajkowa (eng. Fabulous) ^{117}	Swarzędz	May 11, 2017	2 671 939	19,75%	23,30%
202	14	Fang Youn ^{118}	Ostróda	May 18, 2017	2 280 124	17,40%	24,35%

^106Renamed Francuska Bajadera (eng. French Bayadeer) during production
^107Renamed La Casa Del Polacco during production
^108Renamed Biała Choina (eng. White Pine) during production
^109Renamed Wałkowane (eng. Rolled Out) during production
^110Renamed Restauracja Miedziana (eng. Copper Restaurant) during production
^111Renamed La Nonna Siciliana during production
^112Renamed Dom Restauracja Sztum (eng. House Restaurant Sztum) during production
^113Renamed Karpiówka during production
^114Renamed Gęsia Nóżka (eng. Goose Leg) during production
^115Renamed Gar Na Gazie (eng. Pot On Gas) during production
^116Renamed Gospoda Jagoda (eng. Berry Inn) during production
^117Renamed Piknik w Kratkę (eng. Picnic in Check) during production
^118Renamed Gong Ji during production

=== Season 16: Autumn 2017 - Thursday 9.30 p.m. ===
#	#	Restaurant	Location	Original airdate	Official rating 4+	Share 4+	Share 16-49
203	1	Pizzeria Sale & Pepe ^{119}	Sosnowiec	September 7, 2017	2 203 985	16,64%	22,12%
204	2	Ślonsko gościno ^{120}	Tarnowskie Góry	September 14, 2017	2 205 681	17,65%	24,60%
205	3	Stare mury (eng. Old walls) ^{121}	Chrzanów	September 21, 2017	2 491 023	19,61%	25,85%
206	4	1 2 3 ^{122}	Tarnów	September 28, 2017	2 398 842	19,13%	25,46%
207	5	Pirat (eng. Pirate) ^{123}	Olsztyn	October 5, 2017	2 299 221	19,90%	27,67%
208	6	Magiliana ^{124}	Sosnowiec	October 12, 2017	2 672 412	20,59%	29,45%
209	7	Le Papillon Noir ^{125}	Katowice	October 19, 2017	2 870 199	21,58%	27,95%
210	8	Retka ^{126}	Łódź	October 26, 2017	2 526 462	18,70%	24,08%
211	9	Pizzeria Vicenti ^{127}	Lublin	November 2, 2017	2 495 959	18,46%	25,50%
212	10	Niebo w gębie i na talerzu (eng. Sky in gob and on plate) ^{128}	Pabianice	November 9, 2017	2 623 840	18,97%	23,29%
213	11	Restauracja Quatro (eng. Quatro Restaurant) ^{129}	Brańsk	November 16, 2017	2 714 163	19,89%	26,39%
214	12	Kanion (eng. Canyon) ^{130}	Szklarska Poręba	November 23, 2017	2 617 629	18,99%	24,90%
215	13	Esencja i Smak (eng. Essence and Taste) ^{131}	Pszów	November 30, 2017	2 473 062	19,49%	24,73%

^119Renamed Il Pino during production
^120Renamed Restauracja Modra (eng. Deep-blue Restaurant) during production
^121Renamed Utarte during production
^122Renamed Stara Łaźnia (eng. Old Bath) during production
^123Renamed Nie Lada Ryba (eng. Not Counter Fish) during production
^124Renamed Cibo Pazzesco during production
^125Renamed Der Schwarze Schmetterling (eng. Black Butterfly) during production
^126Renamed Kartofel Buda (eng. Potato Shed) during production
^127Renamed ser-o!-mania during production
^128Renamed Latający Johan (eng. Flying Johan) during production
^129Renamed Ziemia Barańsk (eng. Earth Barańsk) during production
^130Renamed Bistro Sztufada during production
^131Renamed Szynk w Pszowie (eng. Inn in Pszowie) during production

- Le Papillon Noir (episode 7, season 16) According to Magda Gessler, so far the worst restaurant in the history of Kitchen Revolution. But in spite of this revolution ended a great success.

=== Season 17: Spring 2018 - Thursday 9.30 p.m. ===
#	#	Restaurant	Location	Original airdate	Official rating 4+	Share 4+	Share 16-49
216	1	Restauracja Granola (eng. Granola Restaurant) ^{132}	Gdynia	February 22, 2018	2 530 210	19,32%	25,24%
217	2	Restauracja Cuda Wianki (eng. Restaurant Wonders Wreaths) ^{133}	Kraków	March 1, 2018	2 552 394	18,54%	23,19%
218	3	Biała Karczma (eng. Inn White)	Grudziądz	March 8, 2018	2 344 895	17,50%	
219	4	Sielsko Anielsko ^{134}	Sieradz	March 15, 2018	2 608 961	19,16%	
220	5	Czerwony Kapturek (eng. Red Riding Hood) ^{135}	Poznań	March 22, 2018			
221	6	Restauracja Marysieńka (eng. Restaurant Marysieńka) ^{136}	Babice	March 29, 2018			
222	7	Restauracja Kwadratowy Talerz (eng. Restaurant Square Plate) ^{137}	Wrocław	April 5, 2018			
223	8	Helios ^{138}	Czerwionka-Leszczyny	April 12, 2018	2 610 288	19,96%	
224	9	Restauracja Ibis (eng. Ibis Restaurant) ^{139}	Goszczanów	April 19, 2018	2 634 357	20,27%	
225	10	Famiglia per amici ^{140}	Łódź	April 26, 2018			
226	11	Bistro przy rondzie (eng. Bistro at the roundabout) ^{141}	Radzionków	May 3, 2018			
227	12	Figa z makiem (eng. Fig with poppy seeds) ^{142}	Kołobrzeg	May 10, 2018			
228	13	No i Fajnie (eng. Well and Nice) ^{143}	Zgierz	May 17, 2018			
229	13	Bar Krupniok (eng. Krupniok Bar) ^{144}	Namysłów	May 24, 2018			

^132Renamed Śledź i chleb (eng. Herring and bread) during production
^133Renamed Kiełbasa i sznurek (eng. Sausage and string) during production
^134Renamed Bistro Siekane (eng. Chopped Bistro) during production
^135Renamed Kotlet Bistro (eng. Cutlet Bistro) during production
^136Renamed Zajazd Babski (eng. Womanish Inn) during production
^137Renamed Bistro By the Way during production
^138Renamed Po prostu stołówka (eng. Just a canteen) during production
^139Renamed Gospoda Kaczki za wodą (eng. Duck's farm behind the water) during production
^140Renamed Trattoria Bandiera Italiana during production
^141Renamed Zaczarowany sad (eng. Enchanted orchard) during production
^142Renamed Ryba z Ikrą (eng. Fish with Ikra) during production
^143Renamed Jeż i jesz (eng. Hedgehog and eat) during production
^144Renamed Bistro Plaaaacek Chrupiący during production

=== Season 18: Autumn 2018 - Thursday 9.30 p.m. ===
#	#	Restaurant	Location	Original airdate	Official rating 4+	Share 4+	Share 16-49
230	1	Sjesta ^{145}	Częstochowa	September 6, 2018	2 145 244	16,62%	23,85%
231	2	Pracownia dobrych smaków – Rozmaryn (eng. Laboratory of good tastes - Rosemary)	Szczecin	September 13, 2018	2 479 067	19,38%	26,37%
232	3	Perfect Pub ^{146}	Pasłęk	September 20, 2018	2 326 749	19,12%	26,85%
233	4	Ziołowa Chata (eng. Herbal Cottage) ^{147}	Brenna	September 27, 2018	1 682 952	11,60%	14,11%
234	5	Alladin's	Wrocław	October 4, 2018	2 459 724	18,42%	23,95%
235	6	Włoszczyzna (eng. Italian)	Łódź	October 11, 2017	2 065 505	14,97%	20,21%
236	7	Czarny Bawół (eng. Black Buffalo) ^{148}	Stare Czarnowo	October 18, 2018	2 308 816	18,18%	22,26%
237	8	James Bomba-Lina ^{149}	Białystok	October 25, 2018	2 298 775	16,98%	23,27%
238	9	Karuzela smaku (eng. Carousel of taste) ^{150}	Warsaw	November 1, 2018	1 878 359	13,66%	17,15%
239	10	Zorba ^{151}	Tychy	November 8, 2018	2 322 711	17,58%	22,73%
240	11	Porto di mare ^{152}	Trzebinia	November 15, 2018	2 342 071	17,08%	21,66%
241	12	Szafran (eng. Saffron) ^{153}	Kwidzyn	November 22, 2018	2 401 202	17,50%	23,05%
242	13	Masala Twist ^{154}	Toruń	November 29, 2018	2 171 472	16,21%	21,93%
243	14	Karczma Ordynat (eng. Entailer Inn) ^{154}	Wielącza	December 6, 2018	2 695 677	20,88%	28,63%

^145Renamed Gospoda Kwaśnica (eng. Barberry Inn) during production
^146Renamed Oberża Bażant (eng. Pheasant Inn) during production
^147Renamed Gospoda z górki (eng. Downhill Inn) during production
^148Renamed Biały Bawół (eng. White Buffalo) during production
^149Renamed Hot Burger Bistro during production
^150Renamed Bielany Bielany during production
^151Renamed Bistro Kalamata during production
^152Renamed Pieczone Gołąbki (eng. Baked cabbage rolls) during production
^153Renamed Soczyste Pieczyste Bistro (eng. Juicy Roast Bistro) during production
^154Renamed Żar Tandoori (eng. Tandoori's heat) during production
^155Renamed Malinowa spiżarnia (eng. Raspberry pantry) during production

=== Season 19: Spring 2019 - Thursday 9.30 p.m. ===
#	#	Restaurant	Location	Original airdate	Official rating 4+	Share 4+	Share 16-49
244	1	Hacjenda (eng. Hacienda) ^{156}	Słupia	February 28, 2019	2 083 367	15,73%	21,86%
245	2	Taste ^{157}	Świnoujście	March 7, 2019	2 291 719	17,67%	26,70%
246	3	Dzika róża (eng. Wild Rose) ^{158}	Rybnik	March 14, 2019	2 121 816	16,79%	21,14%
247	4	Mada ^{159}	Warsaw	March 21, 2019	1 531 545	10,88%	13,94%
248	5	Paradiso ^{160}	Kawice	March 28, 2019	2 200 519	16,94%	22,88%
249	6	Zapiecek ^{161}	Lublin	April 4, 2019	2 147 291	15,87%	22,36%
250	7	Zakątek smaku (eng. A corner of taste) ^{162}	Konstantynów Łódzki	April 11, 2019	1 982 111	15,47%	21,84%
251	8	Pierogarnia (eng. Dumpling) ^{163}	Tczew	April 18, 2019	2 082 847	15,73%	21,86%
252	9	Bar Tarchomin (eng. Tarchomin Bar) ^{164}	Warsaw	April 25, 2019	1 879 174	14,51%	19,80%
253	10	Pierogarnia u Marty (eng. Dumpling at Marta's) ^{165}	Nowogard	May 2, 2019	1 766 121	13,72%	16,69%
254	11	Pierogatka ^{166}	Kalisz	May 9, 2019	2 257 750	17,08%	23,04%
255	12	Pod przykryfką (eng. Under the lid) ^{167}	Gdańsk	May 16, 2019	2 408 626	18,20%	25,96%
256	13	Złota kura (eng. Golden hen) ^{168}	Elbląg	May 23, 2019	2 149 144	15,79%	22,16%

^156Renamed Karczma Żółtodzioby (eng. Yellow-billed Inn) during production
^157Renamed A Morze Las (eng. A Sea Forest) during production
^158Renamed Szynk u Fojermana (eng. Fojerman's ham) during production
^159Renamed Bistro Granat (eng. Bistro Grenade) during production
^160Renamed Karczma Kurak z Pieca (eng. Chicken from the oven Inn) during production
^161Renamed Pyszny Zajazd (eng. Delicious Inn) during production
^162Renamed Oberża dawno, dawno temu... (eng. A long time ago... Inn) during production
^163Renamed Kociewskie Jadło (eng. Kociewskie Food) during production
^164Renamed Viva Ibiza during production
^165Renamed Bistro Gniecione (eng. Bistro Crumpled) during production
^166Renamed Pomidorowe Bistro (eng. Tomato Bistro) during production
^167Renamed Cuba Banana during production
^168Renamed Złote jajo (eng. Golden egg) during production

=== Season 20: Autumn 2019 - Thursday 9.30 p.m. ===
#	#	Restaurant	Location	Original airdate	Official rating 4+	Share 4+	Share 16-49
257	1	Best Bar ^{169}	Ostrów Wielkopolski	September 5, 2019	2 201 516	17,58%	24,11%
258	2	Ludwinka ^{170}	Ludwina	September 12, 2019	1 899 841	15,32%	17,74%
259	3	Zajazd Florencja (eng. Florence Inn) ^{171}	Nowy Klincz	September 19, 2019	1 877 165	14,69%	18,07%
260	4	Gościnna Ukrainka (eng. Guest Ukrainian Woman) ^{172}	Wejherowo	September 26, 2019	1 608 597	10,89%	13,32%
261	5	Tarta poducha (eng. Tart Cushion) ^{173}	Wrocław	October 3, 2019	2 081 463	16,17%	23,21%
262	6	Bistro Galancie ^{174}	Łódź	October 10, 2019	1 728 890	12,72%	15,47%
263	7	Pod zachrypniętym kogutem (eng. Under the hoarse rooster) ^{175}	Glewo	October 17, 2019	1 805 453	14,17%	17,18%
264	8	Ukradli talerz (eng. They stole plates) ^{176}	Prudnik	October 24, 2019	1 908 782	14,83%	21,84%
265	9	U Mariusza (eng. At Mariusz's) ^{177}	Płock	October 31, 2019	1 949 751	15,17%	20,74%
266	10	Vintuna ^{178}	Warsaw	November 7, 2019	1 840 574	14,12%	19,82%
267	11	Kuchnia z piwnicą (eng. Kitchen with basement) ^{179}	Człuchów	November 14, 2019	2 086 323	16,23%	22,16%
268	12	Prova Gourmet ^{180}	Toruń	November 21, 2019	1 856 418	14,30%	20,44%
269	13	Karczma u Sołtysa (eng. Tavern at village administrator) ^{181}	Duszniki Zdrój	November 28, 2019	2 006 709	15,64%	21,98%

^169Renamed Chłop i baba (eng. Peasant and woman) during production
^170Renamed Gęś Pocztowa (eng. Postal Goose) during production
^171Renamed Niezapominajka (eng. Forget-me-not) during production
^172Renamed Barszcz (eng. Borsch) during production
^173Renamed Bistro Pyszne Korzenie (eng. Delicious Roots Bistro) during production
^174Renamed Mammy food during production
^175Renamed Pod rumianym jabłkiem (eng. Under a ruddy apple) during production
^176Renamed Kantyna. Do stołu marsz! (eng. Canteen. March to the table!) during production
^177Renamed Bistro w Kapuście (eng. Bistro in cabbage) during production
^178Renamed Nepal Bowl during production
^179Renamed Bistro prosto z targu (eng. Bistro straight from the market) during production
^180Renamed Osteria di Bitondo during production
^181Renamed Bławatek (eng. Bluebottle) during production

=== Season 21: Spring/Autumn 2020 - Thursday 9.30 p.m. ===
#	#	Restaurant	Location	Original airdate	Official rating 4+	Share 4+	Share 16-49
270	1	Szybka szama (eng. A quick chow down) ^{182}	Napachanie	March 5, 2020	1 956 282	15,58%	22,34%
271	2	Pizza Bella ^{183}	Ustroń	March 12, 2020	1 917 203	14,34%	19,05%
272	3	Pod Kamienicą (eng. Under the tenement house) ^{184}	Grudziądz	March 19, 2020	2 003 056	14,88%	21,48%
273	4	Bistro Smacznego (eng. Bistro Bon Appetit) ^{185}	Banino	March 26, 2020	1 888 838	13.62%	19.45%
274	5	Trattorisa da Maria ^{186}	Kraków	September 3, 2020	1 501 544	12.72%	17.52%
275	6	Bar Kartuska ^{187}	Gdańsk	September 10, 2020	1 651 550	14.32%	19.03%
276	7	Trops Bub Bur ^{188}	Płońsk	September 17, 2020	1 762 656	14.88%	21.97%
277	8	Karczma W Podwórku (eng. Inn in the yard) ^{189}	Cegłów	September 24, 2020	1 784 027	14.32%	18.24%
278	9	Restauracja i Pizzeria Amore Mio (eng. Restaurant and Pizzeria Amore Mio) ^{190}	Chorzów	October 1, 2020	1 839 926	15.21%	22.81%
279	10	Chicken Feet ^{191}	Łapy	October 8, 2020	1 947 471	15.80%	22.22%
280	11	Bistro na Drzewiarzu ^{192}	Jasienica	October 15, 2020	1 625 479	13.08%	17.04%
281	12	Gold ^{193}	Janowo	October 22, 2020	1 846 739	14.50%	20.24%
282	13	Pizzeria Familijna ^{194}	Żerków	October 29, 2020	1 732 562	13.72%	18.09%
283	14	Diavolo ^{195}	Częstochowa	November 5, 2020	2 046 616	15.56%	23.19%
284	15	Restauracja Zamek (eng. Castle Restaurant) ^{196}	Szczecinek	November 12, 2020	2 058 026	15.18%	23.02%
285	16	Pub Barka (eng. Barka Pub) ^{197}	Piła	November 19, 2020	1 859 164	14.35%	18.61%
286	17	Nowa Villa Ostródzka ^{198}	Warsaw	November 26, 2020	1 783 281	13.81%	19.76%

^182Renamed Bistro Schadzka przy Piecu (eng. Bistro Tryst by The Stove) during production
^183Renamed Oberża Dzik i Dąb (eng. Boar and Oak Inn) during production
^184Renamed Przyjemnie Podjadaj (eng. Enjoy Snacking) during production
^185Renamed Karczma Lis i Kura (eng. Fox and Hem Inn) during production
^186Renamed Karczochy u Marii (eng. Artichokes at Maria's) during production
^187Renamed Podaj Kaczkę Raz (eng. Pass the Duck Once) during production
^188Renamed Pizzeria di Bufala during production
^189Renamed Bistro Fiołek (eng. Bistro Violet) during production
^190Renamed Fest Bar during production
^191Renamed Zdolne łapy (eng. Capable hands) during production
^192Renamed Szynka na bogato (eng. Rich ham) during production
^193Renamed Gospoda chałupka (eng. Cottage Inn) during production
^194Renamed Tłusty Indyk (eng. Fat turkey) during production
^195Renamed Chimichuri American House during production
^196Renamed Restauracja W Gnieźnie (eng. Restaurant in Gniezno) during production
^197Renamed Kaczka na wodzie (eng. Duck on the water) during production
^198Renamed W małym domku (eng. In a small house) during production

=== Season 22: Spring 2021 - Thursday 9.30 p.m. ===
#	#	Restaurant	Location	Original airdate Player	Original airdate TVN	Official rating 4+	Share 4+	Share 16-49
287	1	Wielkopolanka (eng. Greater Poland) ^{199}	Barlinek	January 14, 2021	February 18, 2021	1 763 849	14,18%	21,33%
288	2	Gargoły (eng. Gargoyles) ^{200}	Łódź	January 14, 2021	February 25, 2021	1 621 022	13,53%	18,83%
289	3	Sezonowa (eng. Seasonal) ^{201}	Częstochowa	January 14, 2021	March 4, 2021	1 819 012	14,43%	18,58%
290	4	Mikołajek (eng. Mikolajki) ^{202}	Słupsk	January 14, 2021	March 11, 2021	1 855 120	15,19%	20,27%
291	5	Gorąca Patelnia (eng. Hot Frying Pan) ^{203}	Kraków	January 14, 2021	March 18, 2021	1 698 571	13,50%	18,46%
292	6	Na okrągło (eng. Round)	Warsaw ^{204}	January 14, 2021	March 25, 2021	1 437 279	10,39%	12,91%
293	7	Bar u Skwarka (eng. The bar at Skwarek) ^{205}	Pogorzelice	January 21, 2021	April 1, 2021	1 665 781	12,99%	18,01%
294	8	Mąka i magia (eng. Flour and magic) ^{206}	Zambrów	January 28, 2021	April 8, 2021	1 751 878	13,47%	18,15%
295	9	Pierogarnia "Palce lizać" (eng. Dumpling "Lick your fingers") ^{207}	Łódź	February 4, 2021	April 15, 2021	1 732 500	13,78%	18,25%
296	10	4 smaki (eng. 4 flavors) ^{208}	Libiąż	February 11, 2021	April 22, 2021	1 839 707	14,71%	20,62%
297	11	Floriańska ^{209}	Szczyrk	February 18, 2021	April 29, 2021	1 473 176	12,19%	19,80%
298	12	Baku ^{210}	Toruń	February 25, 2021	May 6, 2021	1 613 239	13,19%	18,83%
299	13	Bistro Neptun ^{211}	Gdynia	March 4, 2021	May 13, 2021	1 483 344	11,94%	17,91%
300	14	Bar & Bistro "Wilcza8" ^{212}	Brzeg Dolny	March 20, 2021	May 20, 2021	1 448 244	11,52%	16,95%
301	15	Dama Kier (eng. Lady of Hearts) ^{213}	Lędziny	March 27, 2021	May 27, 2021	1 618 112	13,53%	19,98%

^199Renamed Dzik Dzik Dzik (eng. Boar Boar Boar) during production
^200Renamed Imber (eng. Ginger) during production
^201Renamed Trattoria Verde during production
^202Renamed Złoty Piknik (Eng. Golden Picnic) (eng. Bistro Violet) during production
^203Renamed Kolorowe Patelnie (eng. Colours Pans) during production
^204Renamed Ristorante Caponata Siciliana during production
^205Renamed Karczma Żurawinowa Chatka Zagadka (eng. Inn Cranberry Cottage Enigma) during production
^206Renamed Pizzeria Croccante during production
^207Renamed Doprawione jabłkiem (eng. Seasoned with apple) during production
^208Renamed 4 smaki na języku (eng. 4 flavors on the plate and tongue) during production
^209Renamed Bistro Śliwa (eng. The Plum Bistro) during production
^210Renamed List z Kaukazu (eng. A letter from the Caucasus) during production
^211Renamed Bistro "Niezłe kino" (eng. Nice Cinema Bistro) during production
^212Renamed Kluska Kluskę Pogania (eng. Dumpling A pagan dumpling) during production
^213Renamed Śląskie Niebo (eng. Silesian Heaven) during production

=== Season 23: Autumn 2021 - Thursday 9:30 p.m. ===
#	#	Restaurant	Location	Original airdate	Official rating 4+	Share 4+	Share 16-49
302	1	Modry Kociołek (eng. Deep Blue Cauldron) ^{214}	Piekary Śląskie	September 2, 2021	1 382 519	11,13%	14,55%
303	2	Hotel "Ajax" (eng. Ajax Hotel) ^{215}	Janki, Pruszków County	September 9, 2021	1 468 498	13,21%	18,96%
304	3	Kawiarnio - Bistro ,,Filiżanka" (eng. Cafe - Bistro ,,Cup'') ^{216}	Żyrardów	September 16, 2021	1 511 253	13,35%	18,06%
305	4	Bistro "Tasty" ^{217}	Piekary Śląskie	September 23, 2021	1 649 915	15,35%	19,51%
306	5	Restauracja "Kuźnia Smaków" (eng. Smithy of Flavors Restaurant) ^{218}	Sokołów Podlaski	September 30, 2021	1 552 683	13,61%	17,44%
307	6	Bistro ,,Magnolia" ^{219}	Jawor	October 7, 2021	1 768 307	14,89%	19,08%
308	7	Restaurant ,,Silvano" ^{220}	Połajewo, Greater Poland Voivodeship	October 14, 2021	1 612 883	13,76%	18,70%
309	8	Kura Domowa (eng. House Hen) ^{221}	Zamość	October 21, 2021	1 652 042	14,22%	18,77%
310	9	Bar-Kawiarnia "Marysieńka" (eng. Bar-Cafe Marysienka) ^{222}	Miastko	October 28, 2021	1 695 412	14,20%	19,70%
311	10	Restauracja "Geneza Smaku" (eng. Genesis of Smashs Restaurant) ^{223}	Karpacz	November 4, 2021	1 517 492	13,81%	19,94%
312	11	Orient X-press ^{224}	Grodzisk Mazowiecki	November 11, 2021	1 503 033	12,33%	15,21%
313	12	Bar Mleczny "Agata" (eng. Milk Bar Agata)	Gorzów Wielkopolski	November 18, 2021	1 651 969	14,63%	18,91%
314	13	Bar "Palce Lizać" (eng. Toes Lick Bar) ^{225}	Działdowo	November 25, 2021	1 496 447	13,19%	18,94%
315	14	Okrąglak Residence (eng. Round Residence) ^{226}	Sosnowiec	December 2, 2021	1 515 994	16,46%	20,81%
316	15	Restauracja "W Borach" (eng. Restaurant "In the forests") ^{227}	Żalno	December 9, 2021	1 553 872	13,67%	18,08%

^214Renamed Laboratorium Chleba (eng. Bread Laboratory) during production
^215Renamed Zajazd "Zielone Rykowisko (eng. The Green Rut Inn) during production
^216Renamed Bar Bigosu Czar (eng. Stew Bar Charm) during production
^217Renamed Szynk pod Cycokiem (eng. Ham under the Cycok) during production
^218Renamed Bistro "Prosto Od Serca" (eng. Straight of the Heart Bistro) during production
^219Renamed Kulinarna Fabryka Smaku (eng. Culinary Factory of Taste) during production
^220Renamed Karczma "Gę, gę, gę (eng. The Goose, Goose, Goose Inn) during production
^221Renamed Bistro "Ziemniak czy Kartofel" (eng. Potato or Potato? Bistro) during production
^222Renamed Bistro "Tajemniczy Staw" (eng. Mystery Pond Bistro) during production
^223Renamed Bistro "Pod Papryką" (eng. Under the Paprika Bistro) during production
^224Renamed Pełen Rondel (eng. A full saucepan) during production
^225Renamed Bar Viola (eng. Viola Bar) during production
^226Renamed Dobrze na Okrągło (eng. Well round) during production
^227Renamed Zajazd "Grasz w zielone?" (Do you play green Inn?) during production
-The chef Marzenna Koniuszy (this is episode 12 Milk Bar "Agata" Gorzów Wielkopolski) is died in 20th september 2021.

=== Season 24: Spring 2022 - Thursday 9:35 pm ===
#	#	Restaurant	Location	Original airdate	Official rating 4+	Share 4+	Share 16-49
317	1	Restauracja "Gościnna" (eng. "Hospitable" Restaurant) ^{228}	Bartoszyce	3 march 2022	1 329 739	11,60%	15,29%
318	2	Restauracja "Szmaragdowa" (eng. "Emerald" Restaurant) ^{229}	Kudowa-Zdrój	10 march 2022	1 423 602	12,91%	16,67%
319	3	Restauracja "Imperia" (eng. "Empires" Restaurant) ^{230}	Racibórz	17 marca 2022	1 464 731	13,14%	17,22%
320	4	Restauracja "Staropolska" (eng. "Staropolska" Restaurant)	Szczucin	24 marca 2022	1 074 562	9,21%	11,10%
321	5	Pizzeria "Calabria" ^{231}	Olsztyn	31 marca 2022	1 367 893	11,39%	15,99%
322	6	Restauracja "Masters" (eng. "Masters" Restaurant) ^{232}	Inowrocław	7 kwietnia 2022	1 337 509	11,82%	13,87%
323	7	Restauracja "Polski Nie-Rząd" (eng. Restaurant "Polish Non-Government") ^{233}	Sosnowiec	14 kwietnia 2022	1 402 577	12,30%	15,27%
324	8	Pizzeria "DaviOli" ^{234}	Krzeszyce	21 kwietnia 2022	1 549 575	13,16%	16,78%
325	9	Restauracja Wietnamska "Zielony Nosorożec" (eng. Vietnamese Restaurant "Green Rhino") ^{235}	Białystok	28 kwietnia 2022	1 299 169	11,54%	15,39%
326	10	Pizzeria "Bujani" ^{236}	Tarnów	5 maja 2022	1 446 574	13,28%	19,30%
327	11	Restauracja "Bankietowa" (eng. "Banquet" Restaurant) ^{237}	Czeladź	12 maja 2022	1 293 666	11,13%	14,74%
328	12	"American Dream" Restaurant & Sports bar ^{238}	Wrocław	19 maja 2022	1 288 281	12,04%	16,61%
329	13	"Caverna" Cafe ^{239}	Opole	26 maja 2022	1 297 673	11,97%	17,82%

^228Renamed Restauracja "Piwem Podlane" (eng. "Beer watered" Restaurant) during production
^229Renamed Restauracja Gruzińska "Ghvino i śpiew" (eng. Georgian Restaurant "Ghvino and Singing") during production
^230Renamed Bistro "Entliczek-Pentliczek, czeski knedliczek" (eng. Bistro "Entliczek - Pentliczek, Czech dumplings") during production
^231Renamed "Rumiane" Bistro during production
^232Renamed Bistro "Z gęsią po drodze" (eng. Bistro "With a goose on the way") during production
^233Renamed Bistro "Idziemy w Góry" (eng. Bistro "We're going to the Mountains") during production
^234Renamed Bar "Pan Wurst" (eng. "Mr. Wurst" Bar) during production
^235Renamed Bistro Wietnamskie "Zielony Wietnam" (eng. Vietnamese Bistro "Green Vietnam") during production
^236Renamed Gospoda "Wino i Żarełko u Bujaka" (eng. "Wine and dairy at Bujak's" Inn) during production
^237Renamed Bistro "Prosta Kuchnia" (eng. Bistro "Simple Kitchen") during production
^238Renamed "Queens" Street Bar during production
^239Renamed Bistro "Chrupiąca Kalarepa" (eng. Bistro "Crispy Kohlrabi") during production

=== Season 25: Autumn 2022 - Thursday 9:35 pm ===
#	#	Restaurant	Location	Original airdate	Official rating 4+	Share 4+	Share 16-49
330	1	Pizzeria-Restauracja "Irlandia" (eng. Pizzeria-Restaurant "Ireland") ^{240}	Czechowice-Dziedzice	1 September 2022	1 626 288	12,10%	17,45%
331	2	Kawiarnia i Lunch Bar "Elegancko" (eng. Cafe and Lunch Bar "Elegko") ^{241}	Szczecin	8 September 2022	977 438	8,39%	12,04%
332	3	Restauracja "Smaczne...GO" (eng. Restaurant "Tasty ... GO") ^{242}	Tomaszów Mazowiecki	15 September 2022	1 219 785	11,25%	14,55%
333	4	Restauracja "Cudnie" (eng. Restaurant "Wonderful") ^{243}	Puławy	22 September 2022	1 041 099	9,07%	11,02%
334	5	Restauracja Gruzińska "Sakartvelo" (eng. Georgian Restaurant "Sakartvelo") ^{244}	Zakręt	29 September 2022	1 405 639	12,12%	18,46%
335	6	Restauracja "Fyrtel Smaków" (eng. Restaurant "Fyrtel of Flavors") ^{245}	Kamionki	6 October 2022	1 359 831	12,88%	17,83%
336	7	Restauracja "Limba" (eng. Restaurant "Limba") ^{246}	Barlinek	13 October 2022	1 371 203	12,72%	17,86%
337	8	Bistro "Pod Przykrywką" (eng. Bistro "Under the Cover") ^{247}	Szczecin	20 October 2022	1 548 947	14,28%	18,13%
338	9	Bistro "ĄĘ" ^{248}	Chorzów	27 October 2022	1 444 045	13,93%	17,77%
339	10	Restauracja "Czwórka" (eng. Restaurant "Four") ^{249}	Elbląg	3 November 2022	1 226 356	11,35%	15,85%
340	11	Restauracja "Sho-Sho" (eng. Restaurant "Sho-Sho") ^{250}	Płock	10 November 2022	1 386 040	12,71%	16,95%
341	12	Bistro "43-300" (eng. Bistro "43-300") ^{251}	Bielsko-Biała	17 November 2022	1 540 401	14,22%	18,71%
342	13	Restauracja "Spaghetteria Cucina Italiana" (eng. Restaurant "Spaghetteria Italian Cuisine") ^{252}	Białystok	24 November 2022	1 189 779	10,83%	11,58%
343	14	Restauracja "Kulinarna Warszawka" (eng. Restaurant "Culinary Warszawska street") ^{253}	Kępno	1 December 2022	1 290 045	12,90	15,34%

^240Renamed Trattoria "Tavola Calda Siciliana" during production
^241Renamed Bistro "To tu i To tam" (eng. Bistro "It's here and It's there") during production
^242Renamed Knajpka "Czuszka" during production
^243Renamed Bistro Żydowskie "Pełno w Sieci" (eng. Jewish Bistro "Full on the Web") during production
^244Renamed Zajazd "Do Gruzji 2700km" (eng. Inn "To Georgia 2700km") during production
^245Renamed Restauracja "Złota Świnka" (eng. Restaurant "Golden Pig") during production
^246Renamed Bistro "Kaczki i Buraczki" (eng. Bistro "Ducks and Beets") during production
^247Renamed Bistro "Mam apetyt na..." (eng. Bistro "I have an appetite for ..." ) during production
^248Renamed Bistro "Brylancik" during production
^249Renamed Bar "Pomidor Cud - Malina" (eng. "Tomato Miracle - Raspberry" Bar) during production
^250Renamed Restauracja "Koronkowa robota" (eng. "Lace Work" Restaurant) during production
^251Renamed Bistro "U rodziny Gębalskich" (eng. "At the family of Gębalski" Bistro) during production
^252Renamed Trattoria "Angelino Pasta Wino" (eng. "Angel Pasta Wine" Trattoria) during production
^253Renamed Bar "Sztuka na Raz" (eng. "Art of meat at once" Bar) during production

=== Season 26: Spring 2023 - Thursday 9:35 pm ===
#	#	Restaurant	Location	Original airdate	Official rating 4+	Share 4+	Share 16-49
344	1	Restauracja francuska "Voila" (eng. French Restaurant "Voila") ^{254}	Kraków	23 February 2023	1 443 751	12,97%	17,03%
345	2	Restauracja "Czterech Pancernych" (eng. Restaurant "Four Armored") ^{255}	Biedrusko	2 March 2023	1 291 491	11,35%	14,32%
346	3	Restauracja "Vis a Vis" (eng. Restaurant "Vis a Vis") ^{256}	Mielec	9 March 2023	1 308 675	12,06%	16,73%
347	4	Restauracja "Margaret" (eng. Restaurant "Margaret")	Wrocław	16 March 2023	1 267 266	11,75%	15,54%
348	5	Restauracja "Witnica" (eng. Restaurant "Witnica") ^{257}	Witnica	23 March 2023	1 465 828	13,14%	19,34%
349	6	Karczma "Pod Dębami" (eng. "Under the Oaks" ill) ^{258}	Komorniki	30 March 2023	1 405 068	12,38%	17,34%
350	7	Restauracja Bałkańska "Alexandria" (eng. Balkan Restaurant "Alexandria")	Grodzisk Wielkopolski	6 April 2023	1 310 530	11,47%	14,72%
351	8	Bar „Incognito” (eng. "Incognito" Bar) ^{259}	Trzciel	13 April 2023	1 260 466	12,13%	18,58%
352	9	Restauracja „Nie ma jak u mamy" (eng. "There's No Place Like Mom's" Restaurant) ^{260}	Wrocław	20 April 2023	1 260 231	12,13%	18,58%
353	10	Pizzeria „Dobre Miejsce 65" (eng. Pizzeria "Good Place 65") ^{261}	Poznań	27 April 2023	1 205 002	10,99%	15,61%
354	11	Restauracja „Grande Cozze" (eng. Restaurant "Grande Cozze") ^{262}	Kielce	4 May 2023	1 160 231	10,54%	14,90%
355	12	Pierogarnia „Stary Młyn" (eng. Dumpling shop "Old Mill") ^{263}	Łomża	11 May 2023	1 465 381	13,66%	19,18%
356	13	Pizzeria - Kebab "U Pancia" (eng. Pizzeria - Kebab "At Pancio's") ^{264}	Łódź	18 May 2023	1 153 425	11,09%	17,21%

^254Renamed Bistro francuskie "Voila Avignon" (eng. "Voila Avignon" French Bistro) during production
^255Renamed Bistro "Kolorowe Wazy" (eng. "Colorful Vases" Bistro) during production
^256Renamed Restauracja "Latające Smaki" (eng. "Flying Flavors" Restaurant) during production
^257Renamed Zajazd "Je je jeleń" (eng. The Deer Eats The Inn) during production
^258Renamed Zajazd „Kacze Zamieszanie” (eng. The Duck Confusion Inn) during production
^259Renamed Szynk „U Tasi Terleckiej" (eng. Ham "U Tasia Terlecka") during production
^260Renamed Bistro „Sama rozkosz" (eng. "Pure Pleasure" Bistro) during production
^261Renamed Bar „U Grochowej" (eng. "At Grochowa's" Bar) during production
^262Renamed Trattoria „Buon Posto" during production
^263Renamed Restauracja „Malowane Pierogi" (eng. Restaurant "Painted Dumplings") during production
^264Renamed Restauracja „Doprawiony Pancio" (eng. Restaurant "Seasoned Pancio") during production

=== Season 27: Autumn 2023 - Thursday 9:35 pm ===
#	#	Restaurant	Location	Original airdate	Official rating 4+	Share 4+	Share 16-49
357	1	Restauracja "Cooking & Events" (eng. "Cooking & Events" Restaurant) ^{265}	Czarna Dąbrówka	7 September 2023	783 202	7,25%	7,08%
358	2	Zajazd "Dwa Koguty" (eng. "Two Roosters" Inn) ^{266}	Przędzel	14 September 2023	1 064 082	10,40%	14,34%
359	3	Bar Mleczny (eng. Milk Bar) ^{267}	Warsaw	21 September 2023	1 067 653	10,68%	13,47%
360	4	Karczma "Dziupla u Wuja" (eng. "Hole at Uncle's" Inn) ^{268}	Górki Wielkie	28 September 2023	1 286 053	12,64%	17,01%
361	5	Restauracja "Mio Gastro" (eng. Restaurant "Mio Gastro") ^{269}	Gdańsk	5 October 2023	1 045 863	9,82%	
362	6	Restauracja "Pod Orzechem" (eng. Restaurant "Under the Nut") ^{270}	Bytom	12 October 2023	897 343	7,92%	8,82%
363	7	Bistro "Pyza" (eng. Bistro "Dumpling") ^{271}	Białogard	19 October 2023	1 224 530	11,86%	16,14%
364	8	Bar "Pierożek" (eng. Bar "Patty") ^{272}	Grudziądz	26 October 2023	1 042 181	9,57%	13,16%
365	9	Hot Devil Pizza ^{273}	Łódź	2 November 2023	1 118 768	9,08%	12,87%
366	10	Jani Sushi ^{274}	Tarnów	9 November 2023	1 136 385	10,58%	13,09%
367	11	Bar "Burger i Spółka" (eng. Bar "Burger and Company") ^{275}	Łódź	16 November 2023	1 206 712	11,13%	16,36%
368	12	Kawiarnia "Nusma" (eng. Cafe "Nusma") ^{276}	Lębork	23 November 2023	1 135 055	10,84%	13,69%

^265Renamed Gospoda "Kaszubski polot" (eng. "Kashubian flair" Inn) during production
^266Renamed Gospoda "Lasowiackie serce" (eng. "Lasowiackie Heart" Inn) during production
^267Renamed Bar "Koperkowy" (eng. Bar "Dill") during production
^268Renamed Gospoda "Pękata chata" (eng. "Buffy Cottage" Inn) during production
^269Renamed Trattoria "Melone Rosa" during production
^270Renamed Zajazd "Dziadek do Orzechów" (eng. Nutcracker Inn) during production
^271Renamed Bistro "¡Mama olé!" during production
^272Renamed Bistro "ACH Pomidor" (eng. Bistro "AH Tomato") during production
^273Renamed Przystanek Włochy (eng. Italy stop) during production
^274Renamed Bistro "Kolorowe smarowane sznytki" (eng. Bistro "Colorful spreads") during production
^275Renamed "Ananas Florida" Burger Bar during production
^276Renamed "Śledź Ten Bar" (eng. "Follow This Bar") during production

=== Season 28: Spring 2024 - Thursday 9:35 pm ===
#	#	Restaurant	Location	Original airdate	Official rating 4+	Share 4+	Share 16-49
369	1	Restauracja "Gusto Kuchnia i Wino" (eng. Restaurant "Gusto Kitchen and Wine") ^{277}	Bydgoszcz	7 March 2024	462 841	5,78%	7,28%
370	2	"Karpielówka" ^{278}	Warsaw	14 March 2024	633 320	7,35%	9,72%
371	3	"Don Martinez" ^{279}	Rybnik	21 March 2024	679 437	7,60%	10,19%
372	4	"Na Winklu" (eng. "On Winkel") ^{280}	Nowy Targ	28 March 2024			
373	5	Bistro „Pomylone Gary” (eng. Bistro „Mistaken Gary”) ^{281}	Poznań	4 April 2024			
374	6	„Oaza Smaku" (eng. "Oasis of Taste") ^{282}	Nowy Tomyśl	11 April 2024			
375	7	"Chicken Go" ^{283}	Żnin	18 April 2024			
376	8	Bar "Świńskie Sprawki" (eng. Bar "Pig Affairs") ^{284}	Łódź	25 April 2024			
377	9	"Gościniec" (eng. "Highway") ^{285}	Myszęcin	2 May 2024			
378	10	"Schabowy i Spółka" (eng. "Schnitzel and Company") ^{286}	Kalinowiec	9 May 2024			
379	11	"Art-Smaku" (eng. "Art-Taste") ^{287}	Tarnowskie Góry	16 May 2024			
380	12	Restauracja "Fresco" (eng. "Fresco" Restaurant) ^{288}	Suwałki	23 May 2024			

^277Renamed Dzikowisko (eng. "Wilderness") during production
^278Renamed Karczma u Ceprów (eng. "The Inn at The Cepras'") during production
^279Renamed „Siała Baba Mak” Bar (eng. Bar "The Woman Sowed Poppy") during production
^280Renamed Szynk „Rumiane i Pieczyste” (eng. "Browned and Baked" Ham) during production
^281Renamed "Bistro „Pyr! Pyr! Pyr!” during production
^282Renamed Bistro „Koszyki” (eng. Bistro "Baskets") during production
^283Renamed Bar "Mój Schaboszczak" (eng. Bar "My Pork Chop") during production
^284Renamed Bistro "Sztuka Kochania Mięsa" (eng. Bistro "The Art of Loving Meat") during production
^285Renamed "Jedz! Niebecz" (eng. "Eat! Don't Bleat") during production
^286Renamed Stop Bar "Nad Liwcem" (eng. "Stop Bar "Over Liwcem") during production
^287Renamed Bistro "Czy Kapusty?" (eng. Bistro "Or cabbages?") during production
^288Renamed Restauracja Litewska "Wilniuk" (eng. Lithuanian Restaurant "Wilniuk") during production

=== Season 29: Autumn 2024 - Thursday 9:30 pm ===
#	#	Restaurant	Location	Original airdate	Official rating 4+	Share 4+	Share 16-49
381	1	"Piccownia" ^{289}	Warsaw	5 September 2024			
382	2	Restauracja "Paleta Smaków" (eng. Restaurant "Paleta Smaków")^{290}	Bobowa	12 September 2024			
383	3	Restauracja Lotnicza "Epto" (eng. Aeronautic Restaurant "Epto") ^{291}	Toruń	19 September 2024			
384	4	Restauracja "Meltini" (eng. Restaurant "Meltini") ^{292}	Katowice	26 September 2024			
385	5	Pizzeria "Antonio" ^{293}	Łódź	3 October 2024			
386	6	"Via Piada" ^{294}	Kraków	10 October 2024			
387	7	Karczma "Kujawska" (eng. Inn "Kujawska") ^{295}	Włocławek	17 October 2024			
388	8	Restauracja "Kuchnia na górce" (eng. Restaurant "Kuchnia na górce") ^{296}	Zielona Góra	24 October 2024			
389	9	Restauracja Gruzińska "Suliko" (eng. Georgian Restaurant "Suliko") ^{297}	Podkowa Leśna	31 October 2024			
390	10	"Głodny Polak" ^{298}	Rawicz	7 November 2024			
391	11	Bistro "Rozmaryn" ^{299}	Warsaw	14 November 2024			
392	12	Restauracja "Czarny Domek" (eng. Restaurant "Czarny Domek") ^{300}	Konin	21 November 2024			

^289Renamed Pizzeria „Ragazzi da Mangiare” during production
^290Renamed Karczma „Śliwkowa Bobowa” (eng. Inn „Śliwkowa Bobowa”) during production
^291Renamed Bistro „PodNiebienie” during production
^292Renamed Szynk „Rumiane i Pieczyste” (eng. "Browned and Baked" Ham) during production
^281Renamed „Bayer Landhaus Szynk” during production
^282Renamed Bistro „Koszyki” (eng. Bistro "Baskets") during production
^283Renamed Bar "Mój Schaboszczak" (eng. Bar "My Pork Chop") during production
^284Renamed Bistro "Sztuka Kochania Mięsa" (eng. Bistro "The Art of Loving Meat") during production
^285Renamed "Jedz! Niebecz" (eng. "Eat! Don't Bleat") during production
^286Renamed Stop Bar "Nad Liwcem" (eng. "Stop Bar "Over Liwcem") during production
^287Renamed Bistro "Czy Kapusty?" (eng. Bistro "Or cabbages?") during production
^288Renamed Restauracja Litewska "Wilniuk" (eng. Lithuanian Restaurant "Wilniuk") during production

=== Season 30: Spring 2025 - Thursday 8:50 pm ===
#	#	Restaurant	Location	Original airdate	Official rating 4+	Share 4+	Share 16-49
393	1	Bar „Schab w Panierce” ^{301}	Borysławice	27 February 2025			
394	2	Bar "Baszta" ^{302}	Świdnica	6 March 2025			
395	3	„Nasze Smaki” ^{303}	Koronowo	13 March 2025			
396	4	Bistro „Zalewajka” ^{304}	Sierpów	20 March 2025			
397	5	Pizzeria „Worek Mąki ^{305}	Gdynia	27 March 2025			
398	6	„Stara Kuźnia” ^{306}	Magnuszew	3 April 2025			
399	7	„Piwnica Smaku" ^{307}	Turek	10 April 2025			
400	8	Restauracja „EkoTradycja” (eng. Restaurant „EkoTradycja”) ^{308}	Cieszyn	17 April 2025			
401	9	„Hot Italian Pizza” ^{309}	Zielona Góra	24 April 2025			
402	10	Bistro „Mateczka” ^{310}	Wójtowo	1 May 2025			
403	11	Restauracja Azjatycka „Asia Box” (eng. Asian Restaurant "Asia Box") ^{311}	Gorzów Wielkopolski	8 May 2025			
404	12	Dom Przyjęć „Stodoła” (eng. Reception House „Stodoła”) ^{312}	Świerklany	15 May 2025			
405	13	Bistro „12” ^{313}	Siedliszcze	22 May 2025			

^301Renamed Zajazd „Polskie Drogi” (eng. Inn „Polskie Drogi”) during production
^302Renamed Jedz I Bas(z)ta” during production
^303Renamed Bistro „Gęsiarka”” during production
^304Renamed „Pyza w sosie” „(przy szosie)” during production
^305Renamed „Maleńka Kapadocja” during production
^306Renamed „Borowikowy Las" during production
^307Renamed „Piwnica Smaku" during production
^308Renamed Restauracja „Śląski Cysorz” (eng. Restaurant „Śląski Cysorz”) during production
^309Renamed Trattoria „La Piccola Strada” during production
^310Renamed Restauracja „Polna na Jaśminowej" (eng. Restaurant „Polna na Jaśminowej") during production
^311Renamed „Złoty Tygrys” during production
^312Renamed Karczma „Sasanka" (eng. Inn „Sasanka") during production
^313Renamed Restauracja „Por-Fawor” (eng. Restaurant „Por-Fawor”) during production

== Kitchen Returns ==
#	#	Restaurant	Location	Original airdate	Original season	Original episode
1	1	Mee...lina	Miłakowo	March 5, 2015	9	116
2	2	Metka	Poznań	March 12, 2015	4	48
3	3	Obora	Gryfów Śląski	March 19, 2015	6	64
4	4	Marylin	Straszyn	March 26, 2015	8	105
5	5	Absynt	Nowy Targ	April 2, 2015	8	97
6	6	American House	Kielce	April 9, 2015	7	82
7	7	Tawerna Dominikańska	Gdańsk	April 16, 2015	2	22
8	8	Gościniec myśliwski	Gdańsk	April 23, 2015	10	118
9	9	Bufet Rulandia	Ruda Śląska	April 30, 2015	9	109
10	10	Samui	Kraków	May 7, 2015	5	56

=== Season 2: Autumn 2015 - Thursday 9:50 p.m. ===
#	#	Restaurant	Location	Original airdate	Original season	Original episode
11	1	Gaumarjos	Warsaw	September 3, 2015	6	75
12	2	Kiełbacha i Korale	Bukowina Tatrzańska	September 10, 2015	5	50
13	3	Dom Bawarski	Tychy	September 17, 2015	8	103
14	4	Ąka	Lublin	September 24, 2015	6	68
15	5	Pyza Śląska	Dąbrowa Górnicza	October 1, 2015	10	127
16	6	Schabowy Raz	Babi Dół	October 8, 2015	7	79
17	7	Syrenka	Ustka	October 15, 2015	5	52
19	8	Karczma Leśniczanka	Wielbark	October 22, 2015	6	73
19	9	Gęsie Sprawki	Chełm	October 29, 2015	10	125
20	10	Beka	Puck	November 5, 2015	8	100

=== Season 3: Autumn 2017 - Thursday 10:30 p.m. ===
#	#	Restaurant	Location	Original airdate	Original season	Original episode
21	1	Gorąca Kiełbasiarnia	Łódź	November 16, 2017	8	99
22	2	Twoja Kolejka	Łodygowice	November 23, 2017	14	184
23	3	Pod prosiakiem	Tychy	November 30, 2017	3	24
24	4	Bistro Zawijane	Pruszcz Gdański	December 7, 2017	13	164
25	5	Owce i róża	Brenna	December 14, 2017	12	149
26	6	La Nonna Siciliana	Toruń	December 21, 2017	15	194

=== Season 4: Autumn 2022 - Saturday 7:30 p.m. ===
#	#	Restaurant	Location	Original airdate	Original season	Original episode
27	1	Bar Mleczny "Klucha kluchę pogania"	Brzeg Dolny	September 3, 2022	22	300
28	2	Panorama	Gdańsk	September 10, 2022	1	2
29	3	Gospoda "Weranda"	Mrozy	September 17, 2022	2	12
