= Kiełpino Kartuskie railway station =

Railway station in Pomeranian Voivodeship, Poland

Kiełpino Kartuskie
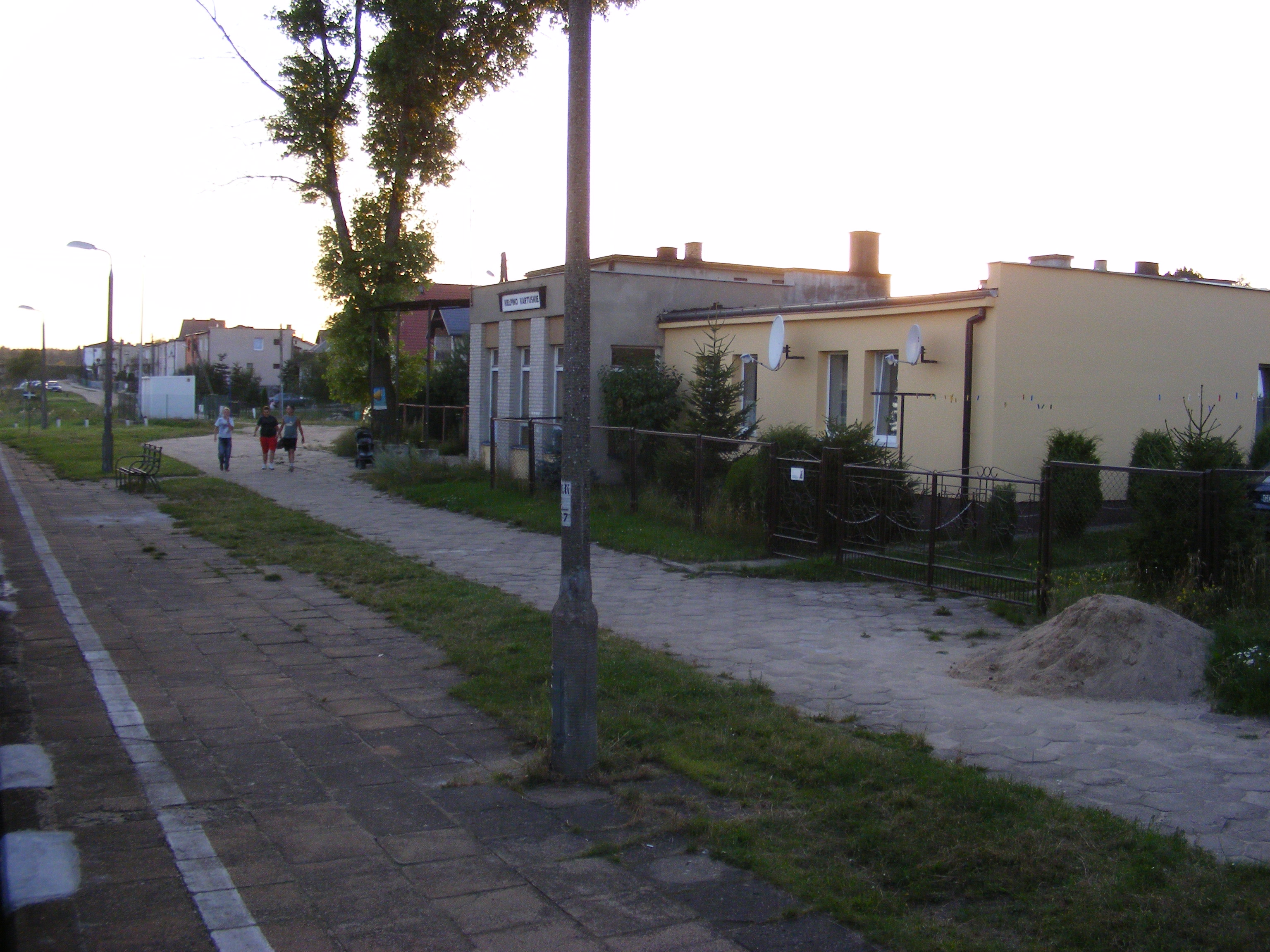
- Kiełpino Kartuskie railway station in 2007

General information
- Location: Kiełpino, Pomeranian Voivodeship; Poland
- System: Railway Station
- Operator: SKM Tricity
- Line: 201: Nowa Wieś Wielka–Gdynia Port railway
- Platforms: 1
- Tracks: 1

History
- Rebuilt: 2014
Location
- Location within Poland

Kiełpino Kartuskie railway station is a railway station serving the town of Kiełpino, in the Pomeranian Voivodeship, Poland. The station is located on the Nowa Wieś Wielka–Gdynia Port railway. The train services are operated by SKM Tricity.

== Modernisation ==
In 2014 the platform was modernised.

== Train services ==
The station is served by the following services:

- Pomorska Kolej Metropolitalna services (R) Kościerzyna — Gdańsk Port Lotniczy (Airport) — Gdańsk Wrzeszcz — Gdynia Główna
- Pomorska Kolej Metropolitalna services (R) Kościerzyna — Gdańsk Osowa — Gdynia Główna

Preceding station	Polregio	Following station
Somonino towards Kościerzyna	PR (Via Gdańsk Osowa)	Babi Dół towards Gdynia Główna
Somonino towards Kościerzyna	PR (Via Gdańsk Port Lotniczy (Airport) and Gdańsk Wrzeszcz)	Babi Dół towards Gdynia Główna
