= Somonino–Kartuzy railway =

Railway line in Poland

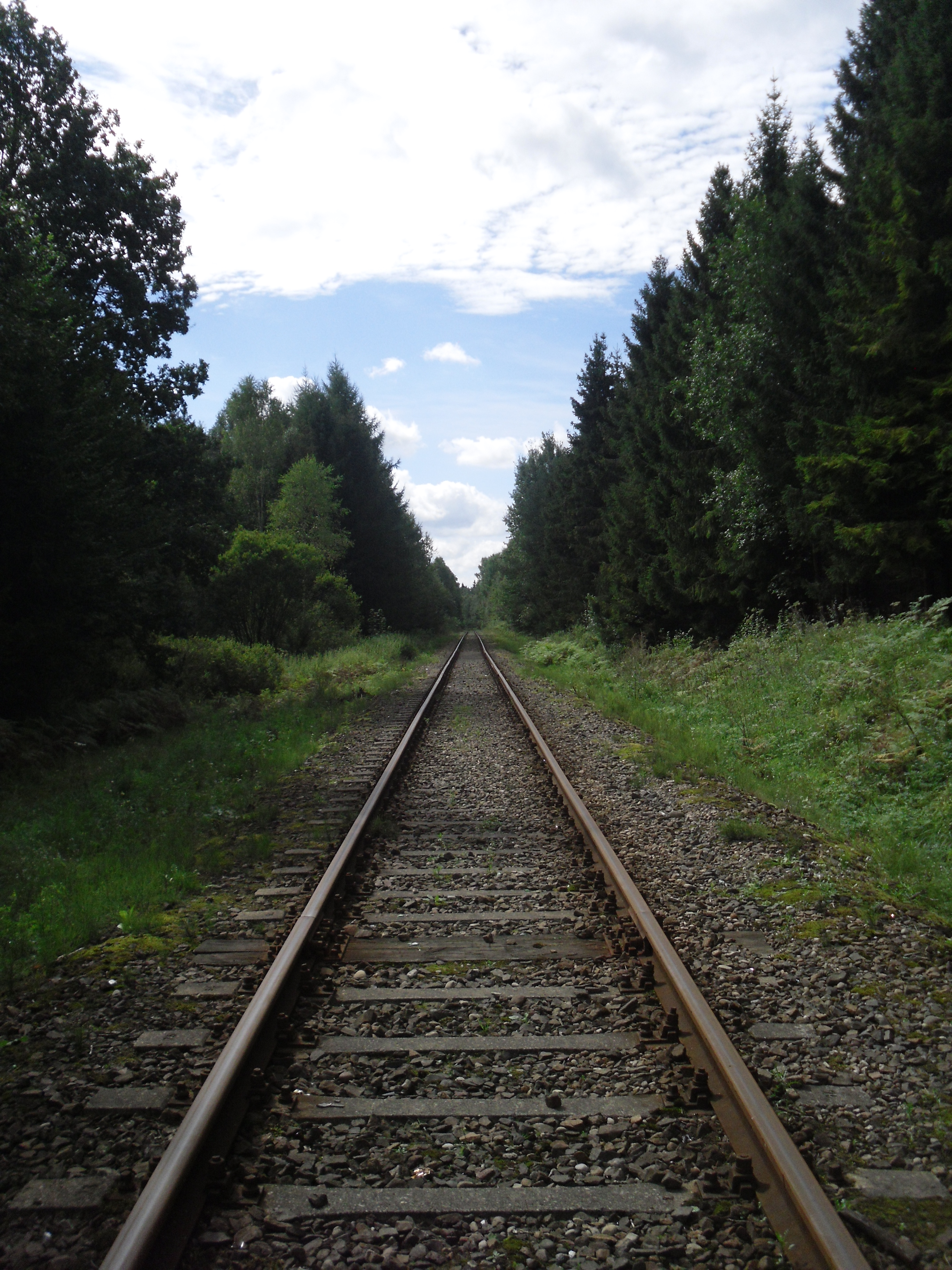
- Somonino–Kartuzy railway between Kartuzy and Leszno Kartuskie

Overview
- Owner: PKP Polskie Linie Kolejowe
- Line number: 214
- Termini: Somonino; Kartuzy

Technical
- Line length: 8,394 km (5,216 mi)
- Track gauge: 1,435 mm (4 ft 8 1/2 in)
- Operating speed: 0 km/h (0 mph)
Route map

Somonino–Kartuzy railway is a secondary, non-electrified, single-track railway line in the Pomeranian Voivodeship. It is a fragment of the former Kościerzyna–Kartuzy railway. From 1918 to 1930, it was the only Polish line to Gdynia that bypassed the territory of the Free City of Danzig. In 2003, regular passenger train services were suspended on the line, though between 2010 and 2014, seasonal services operated during the summer months.

== Route ==
Somonino–Kartuzy railway begins at Somonino railway station, where it branches off to the left from Nowa Wieś Wielka–Gdynia Port railway. Initially heading northeast, it then turns northwest, following a path similar to Provincial Road No. 224. The line passes through the only settlement along its route (Leszno). After Leszno, it resumes heading northeast and ends in Kartuzy.

Between 2022 and 2023, a new section of Somonino–Kartuzy railway was constructed, allowing trains to travel from Kościerzyna and Somonino through Kartuzy towards the Tricity area without the need to change direction, which shortens travel time.

The entire line is located within the Kartuzy County and the Kashubian Lake District mesoregion.

== History ==
=== 1901–1945 ===
Somonino–Kartuzy railway was established in 1901 as a connection between Kartuzy and Kościerzyna. It was a typical Prussian line designed to connect the capitals of neighboring counties. The section of the current Somonino–Kartuzy railway was opened on 14 November 1901, but passenger trains did not begin operating until 1 December. After 16 days, train services were suspended due to a severe winter that caused a derailment of a train traveling between Kościerzyna and Kartuzy. In 1909, a station was built in Kartuzy. Between 1918 and 1930, following Poland's regained independence and until the construction of the Polish Coal Trunk-Line, the Kościerzyna–Kartuzy line was the only connection to Gdynia that bypassed the territory of the Free City of Danzig. As a result, despite being classified as a local line, traffic was significant. Additionally, the location of the station in Kartuzy was inconvenient, as trains had to change direction, which involved turning the steam locomotives. After 1930, the line became strictly a local one, but its importance grew compared to the period before 1918, as it became the shortest connection between Kartuzy and Gdynia.

=== 1945–1989 ===
During World War II, the station in Kartuzy was destroyed by fire, and the line became impassable by the end of the conflict. Passenger service between Kartuzy and Somonino was restored in May 1945. Trains from and to Kartuzy were connected in Somonino with trains to Gdynia and Kościerzyna. A new station was opened in 1953. In 1979, the only passenger stop between Somonino and Kartuzy was established in Leszno.

=== After 1989 ===
In March 2001, thanks to intervention and funding from the Pomeranian Voivodeship government, the line was saved from closure.

On 1 February 2003, passenger services were suspended, although railbus services were provided. These services were partially reactivated in 2010, with seasonal services to Kartuzy (except in the year when the trains to Kartuzy were not running due to the reconstruction of Nowa Wieś Wielka–Gdynia Port and Pruszcz Gdański–Łeba railways).

In 2010, seasonal passenger services were resumed on the Gdynia Główna–Kartuzy route. This connection operated until 2014. In 2015, the service could not be resumed due to the renovation of Nowa Wieś Wielka–Gdynia Port and Pruszcz Gdański–Łeba railways. On 1 October, a regular connection between Kartuzy and the Tricity area was launched via Pruszcz Gdański–Łeba railway.

On 25 September 2017, PKP Polskie Linie Kolejowe signed a contract with Egis Poland for the preparation of the electrification project documentation for Somonino–Kartuzy railway.

On 13 July 2022, a tender was announced for the modernization and electrification of the entire line under the "design and build" scheme.

== Infrastructure ==
The entire length of the line is single-track and not electrified. Between 2022 and 2023, a new section of Somonino–Kartuzy railway was constructed, enabling trains from Kościerzyna and Somonino to travel through Kartuzy towards the Tricity area without the need to change direction, which shortens travel time.

=== Junction stations ===
Location	Diagram	Railway line
Somonino		Nowa Wieś Wielka–Gdynia Port railway
Kartuzy		Pruszcz Gdański–Łeba railway

=== Operational points ===
Each of the stations on the line was built at different times and in different styles, and none of them have preserved their original Prussian style. The station building in Somonino is an example of a combination of two structures – an older one dating back to the time of the line's construction, to which a building was added in a style similar to the ones found on the Bydgoszcz–Gdynia line, which were used for most of the stations in the northern part of the Polish Coal Trunk-Line. In Leszno Kartuskie, due to the station's creation in the 1970s and its limited significance, the station building is a small metal hut resembling those used at bus stops. The station in Kartuzy was built in the 1950s, as the previous one was destroyed in a fire during the war. The new building was constructed from scratch, so it bears no resemblance to the pre-war building. In November 2016, it was demolished to make way for a new station that would resemble the historical one in its design.

Name of the railway station	Photo	Number of platform edges	Infrastructure
Somonino		2	shelter; loudspeakers
Leszno Kartuskie		1	
Kartuzy		2	inactive locomotive depot; inactive water tower; shelter; loudspeakers
