= Babi Dół railway station =

Railway station in Babi Dół, Poland

Babi Dół
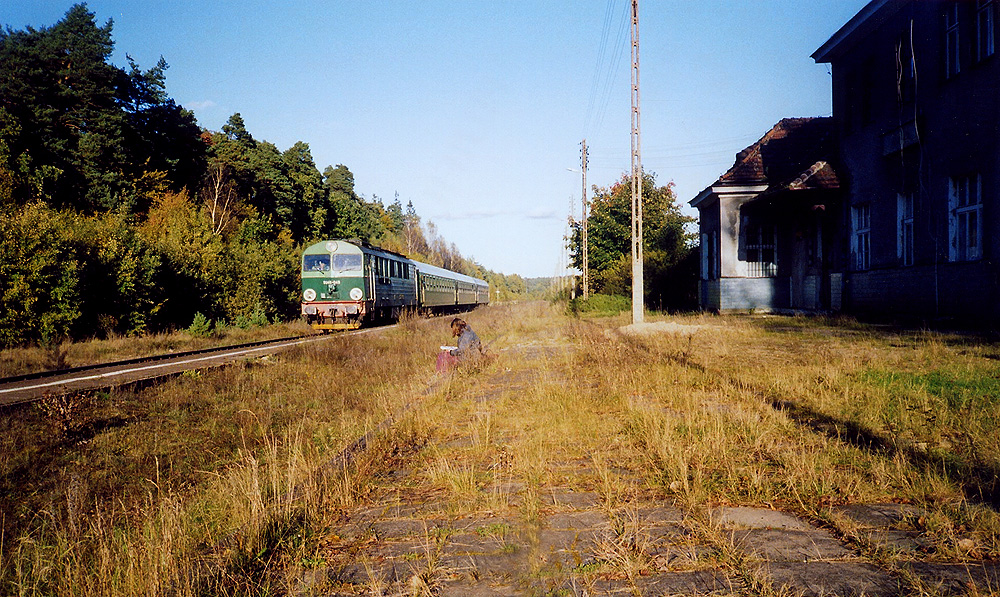
- Babi Dół railway station in 2007

General information
- Location: Babi Dół, Pomeranian Voivodeship; Poland
- System: Railway Station
- Operator: SKM Tricity
- Line: Nowa Wieś Wielka–Gdynia Port
- Platforms: 1
- Tracks: 1

History
- Opened: 22 May 1932; 94 years ago
- Rebuilt: 2014
Location
- Location within Poland

Babi Dół railway station is a railway station serving the town of Babi Dół, in the Pomeranian Voivodeship, Poland. The station opened in 1932 and is located on the Nowa Wieś Wielka–Gdynia Port railway. The train services are operated by SKM Tricity.

== History ==
During the German occupation, the station was called Babental.

Formerly the station had an important role in freight transport, it mainly served as a point of loading wood from nearby forests. Today, the station is commonly used by trip lovers, as a popular route along the Valley of Radunia starts in Babi Dół. Additional rails are now dismantled.

== Modernisation ==
In 2014 a new platform was built to replace the old platform.

== Station building ==
The whole complex of the Babi Dół station was built in the 1920s during the construction of the main coal line from Silesia to Gdynia. Both main buildings and auxiliary buildings (warehouse and toilets) were built in dominating in those times "national" style, which resembles architecture from the region of Lublin and Kazimierz. Nowadays the building is closed and serves as living quarters. No ticket office is available at the station.

== Other buildings ==
A non-operational signal box building is located nearby the station. The building is largely devastated, lacking even doors or windows. No bridge or tunnel was ever present at this station.

== Train services ==
The station is served by the following services:

- Pomorska Kolej Metropolitalna services (PR) Kościerzyna - Gdańsk Port Lotniczy (Airport) - Gdańsk Wrzeszcz - Gdynia Główna
- Pomorska Kolej Metropolitalna services (PR) Kościerzyna - Gdańsk Osowa - Gdynia Główna

Preceding station	Polregio	Following station
Kiełpino Kartuskie towards Kościerzyna	PR (Via Gdańsk Osowa)	Borkowo towards Gdynia Główna
Kiełpino Kartuskie towards Kościerzyna	PR (Via Gdańsk Port Lotniczy (Airport) and Gdańsk Wrzeszcz)	Borkowo towards Gdynia Główna
