= Kartuzy railway station =

Railway station in Kartuzy, Poland

Kartuzy
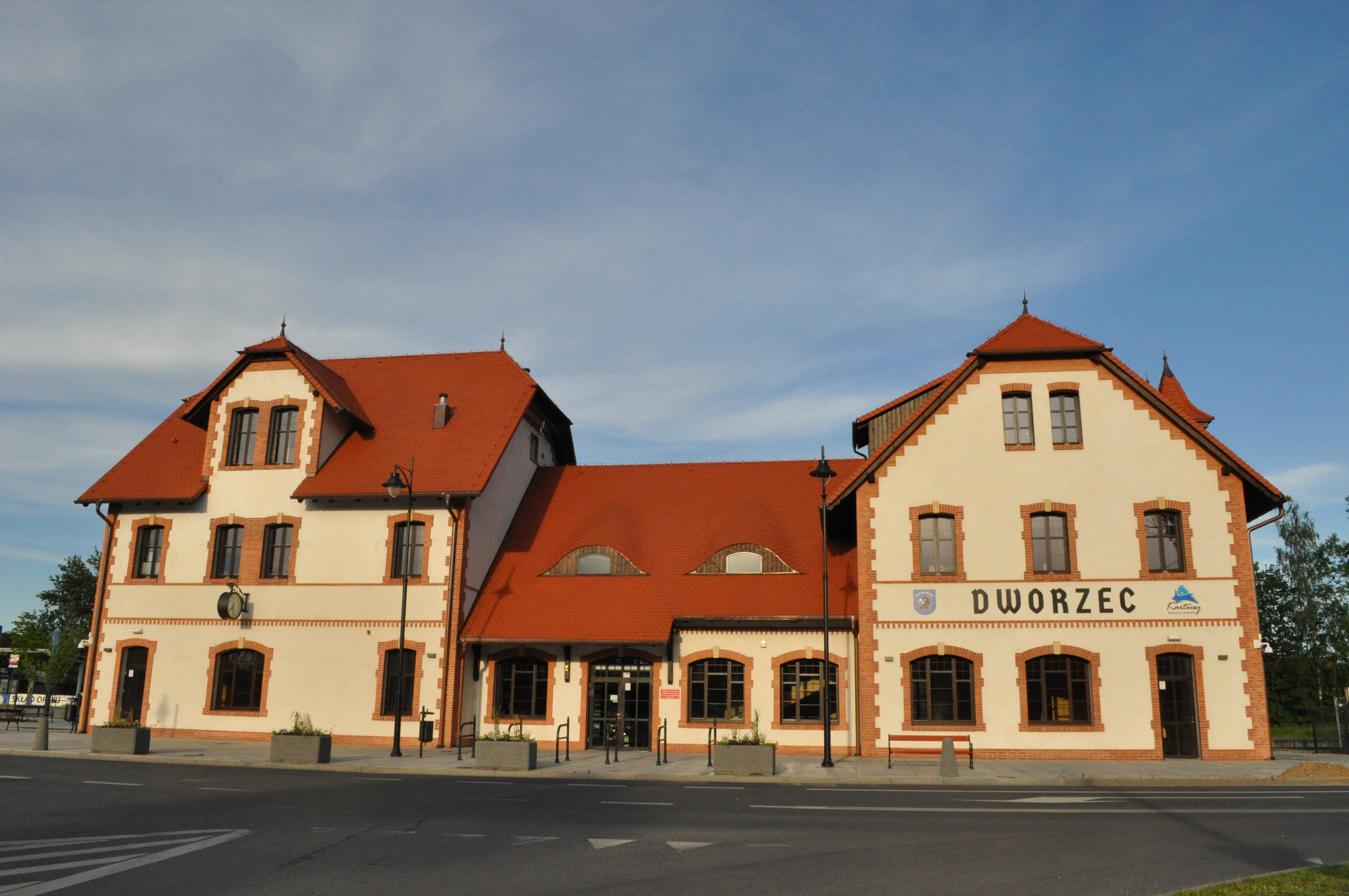
- Kartuzy railway station

General information
- Location: Kartuzy, Pomeranian Voivodeship; Poland
- System: Railway Station
- Operator: SKM Tricity
- Lines: 214: Somonino–Kartuzy railway 229: Pruszcz Gdański–Łeba railway
- Platforms: 3

History
- Opened: 1 November 1886; 139 years ago 1 October 2015; 10 years ago
- Former names: Karthaus (Westpreußen) (1939-1945)
Location
- Location within Poland

Kartuzy railway station is a railway station in the town of Kartuzy, in the Pomeranian Voivodeship, Poland. The original railway through Dzierżążno opened in 1886. The station closed to passenger trains in 2004. The station re-opened on 1 October 2015 and is located on the Somonino–Kartuzy railway and Pruszcz Gdański–Łeba railway. The train services are operated by SKM Tricity as part of the Pomorska Kolej Metropolitalna (PKM).

== History ==
The first line to reach Kartuzy was Glincz-Kartuzy line in 1886. The line to Pruszcz Gdański was closed for all transport on May 29, 1994. The connection to Stara Piła was closed for passenger transport in 1997. Connection with Lębork was closed on June 23, 2000, connections with Sierakowice in 2004.

On November 14, 1901, line from Somonino reached Kartuzy as a freight line (one month later opened as a passenger line as well). The line was closed for passenger transport on February 1, 2003.

Modernisation of the Pruszcz Gdański–Łeba railway and the rebuilding of Kartuzy and Dzierżążno stations took place between May and September 2015. From 1 October 2015, passenger train services resumed in Kartuzy. In the time that the station had been closed, the railways had still been used for freight trains.

== Station buildings ==
The station building is now occupied mostly by shops. Locomotives depot (roundhouse) is still present, together with a turntable, but this is in a poor condition. The second depot was destroyed in 1945 by Soviets. On one of the auxiliary tracks PKP class Ty2-14 locomotive is placed as a monument. Two signal boxes were servicing this station (Ky and Ky2). There is still present steam locomotives servicing object, with water and coal loading devices.

== Train services ==
The station is served by the following services:

- Pomorska Kolej Metropolitalna services (R) Kartuzy — Gdańsk Port Lotniczy (Airport) — Gdańsk Główny

Preceding station	Polregio	Following station
Dzierżążno towards Gdańsk Główny	PR (Via Gdańsk Port Lotniczy (Airport))	Terminus
