= Leszno Kartuskie railway station =

Railway station in Kartuzy County, Poland

Coordinates: 54°17′55″N 18°12′04″E

Leszno Kartuskie
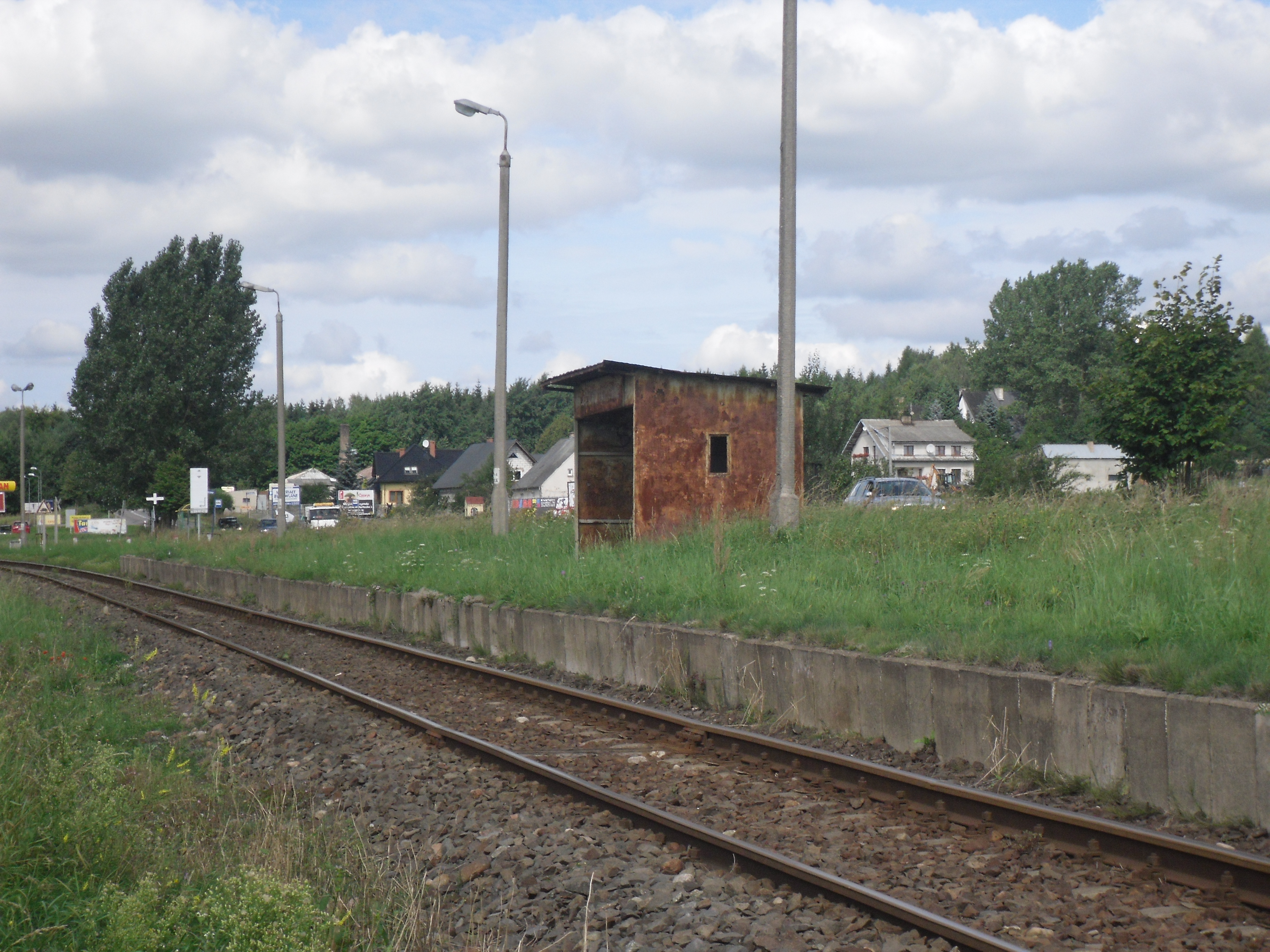

General information
- Location: Leszno Kartuskie; Poland
- Owner: Polskie Koleje Państwowe S.A.
- Platforms: 1

Construction
- Structure type: Building: Never existed Depot: Never existed Water tower: Never existed
Location

Leszno Kartuskie is a non-operational PKP railway station in Leszno Kartuskie (Pomeranian Voivodeship), Poland.

== Lines crossing the station ==
Start station	End station	Line type
Somonino	Kartuzy	Closed
