= Bartosz Tomaszek =

Polish composer

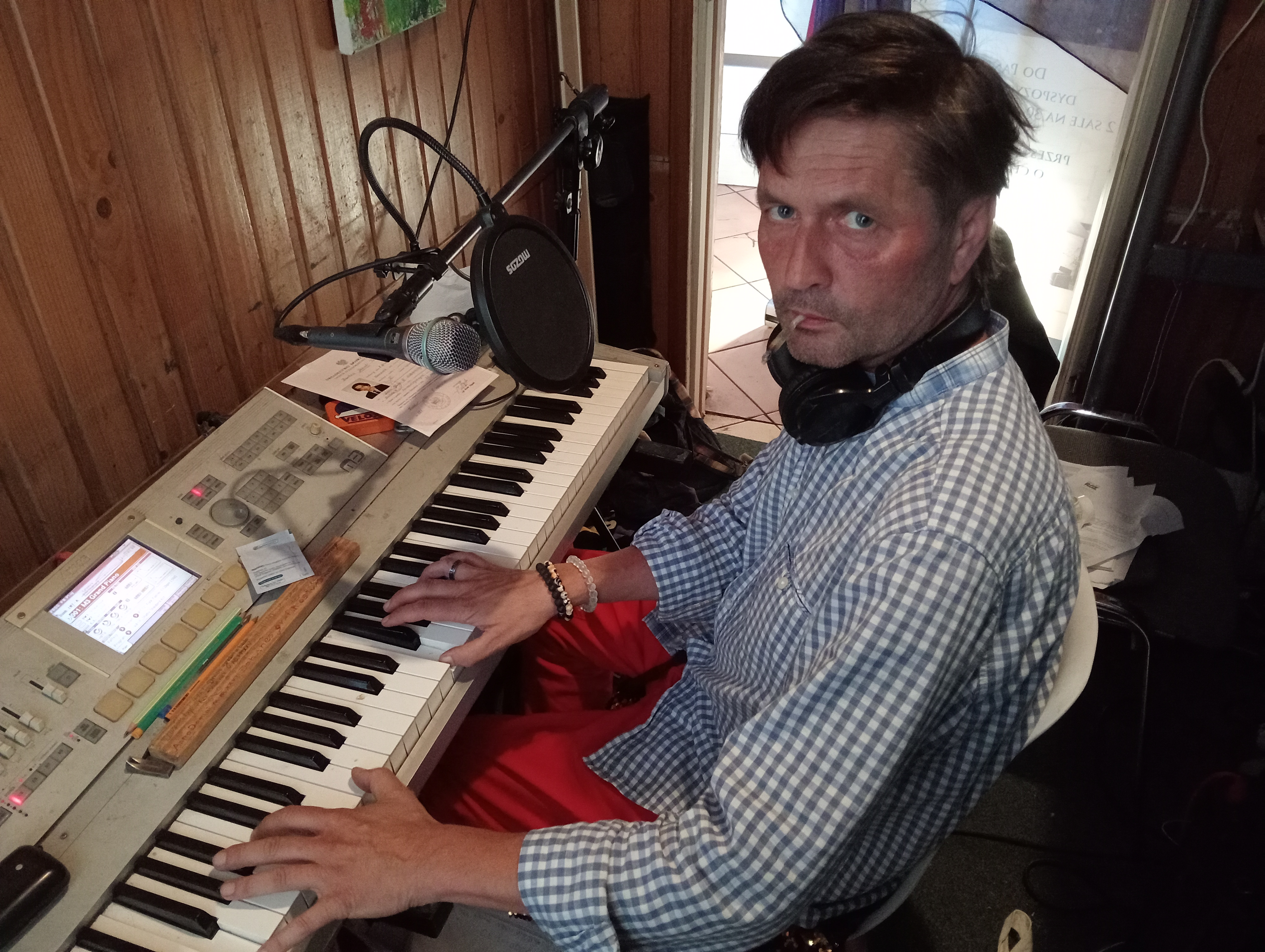
- Bartosz Tomaszek in 2026
- Occupation: Composer

Bartosz Tomaszek is a composer.

== Biography ==
He was a founder of the PatronArt Foundation that promotes classical and popular music. He was a member of jury at Przystanek Mistrzejowice in 2013. He has composed several musical works commemorating Pope John Paul II. He co-composed Anna Szałapak and Michał Zabłocki record Anikoty (2026), as composer of the song “Spokój”.

== Filmography ==
- Usterka (2002, TV show)
- Miasto zbrodni (2003, TV series)
- Juarez, Mexico (2004, documentary film)
- 3 Love (2004, short film)
- Teraz my! (2005, TV show)
- Katastrofy górnicze (2008, TV show)
- Heniek (2010)
- Kuchenne rewolucje (2010, TV show)
- Czarno na białym (2011)
- Po prostu (2013, TV show)
- Polacy w Rzymie i Watykanie (2014, TV show)
- Film z angielskimi napisami (2020)

Source.

== Theatre work ==
- Do matki (2004; Państwowa Wyższa Szkoła Teatralna Theater, directed by Mirka Szawińska)

== Accolades ==
In 2013, together with Adam Niedzielin, he earned Grand Prix Komeda at the Krzysztof Komeda Film Festival in Ostrów Wielkopolski, for scoring the film Heniek.
