= Magdalena Gessler =

Polish restaurateur and television personality

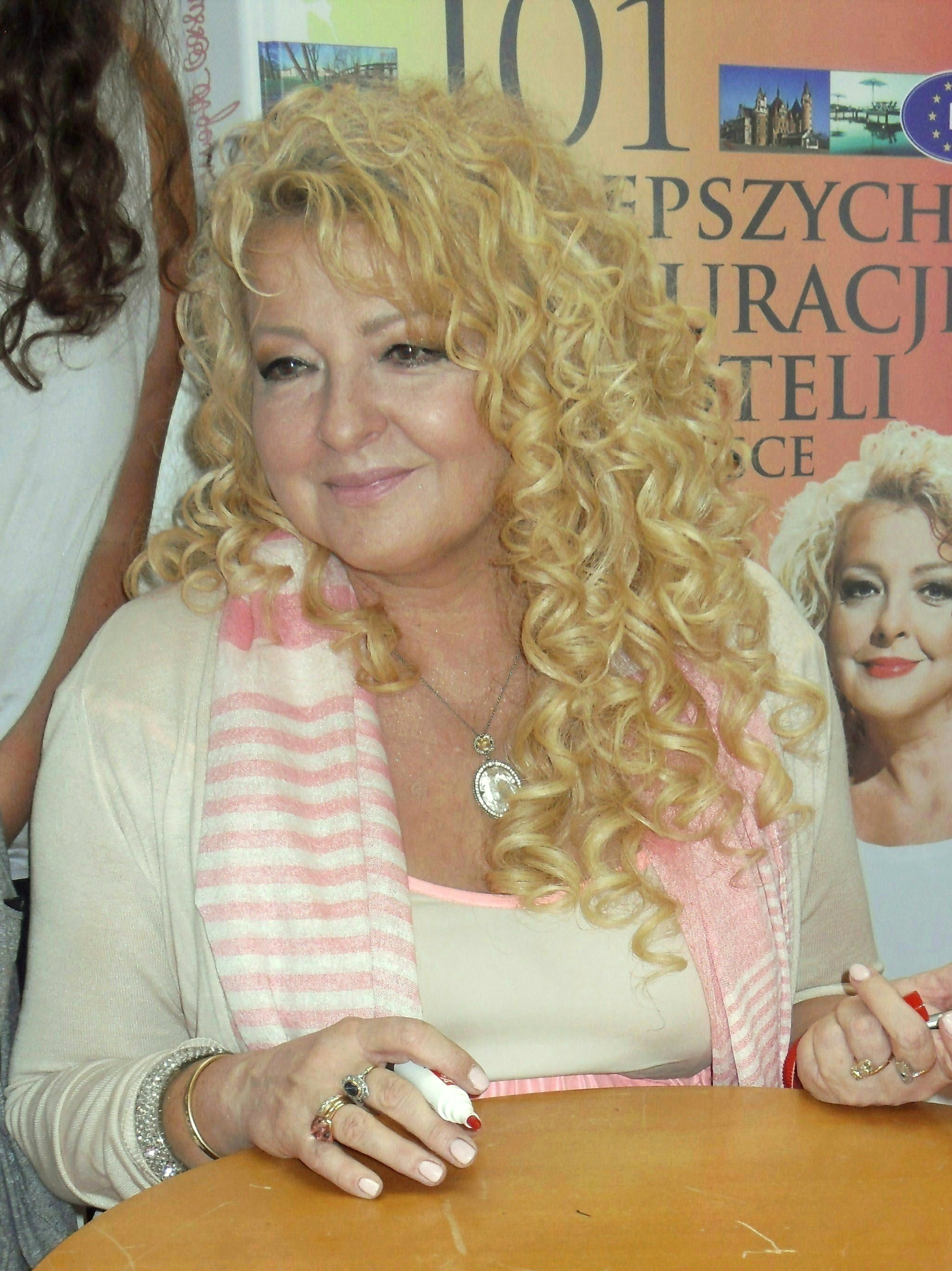
- Gessler in 2015
- Born: Magdalena Daria Ikonowicz; 10 July 1953 (age 73); Komorów, Poland
- Education: Real Academia de Bellas Artes de San Fernando
- Occupations: Restaurateur, painter
- Spouse(s): 1st - Volkhart Müller; 2nd - Piotr Gessler; Current - Waldemar Kozerawski
- Parent(s): Mirosław Ikonowicz, Olga Ikonowicz née Łucek
- Relatives: Piotr Ikonowicz (brother); Waldemar Kozerawski Junior (stepson)
- Culinary career
- Current restaurant: U Fukiera
- Television show(s): Kuchenne rewolucje MasterChef Odkrycia Magdy Gessler
- Website: http://www.magdagessler.pl/

Magdalena Daria Gessler (née Ikonowicz, also known as Magda Gessler; born July 10, 1953) is a Polish television personality, celebrity chef, restaurateur and painter. Gessler is known for presenting TV programme Kuchenne rewolucje (Polish version of Kitchen Nightmares) and judging in Polish version of MasterChef.

== Early life and education ==
Gessler was born in Komorów. She is the daughter of Mirosław Ikonowicz, a former correspondent for the Polish Press Agency, and Olga Ikonowicz (née Łucek) (1931-2001), who worked as an audio director at Polish Radio. Her mother was of Russian descent and her father came from Vilnius. Her paternal grandmother was of Italian descent and her paternal grandfather's family originated from the Balkans.

Due to her mother's poor health suffering from tuberculosis at birth, she was placed in the care of her grandparents, confectioners Irena and Leon Łucek, who lived in Komorów. She then lived with her family in Warsaw's Muranów district. Due to the nature of her father's work, she lived in Sofia from 1956 to 1959 and in Havana from 1963 to 1967. She has a younger brother, Piotr, who is a politician, lawyer and journalist. Her godfather was Ryszard Kapuscinski, a family friend.

In 1972 Gessler settled in Madrid, where she graduated from the Royal Academy of Fine Arts.

== Career ==
Gessler published three cookbooks: Kuchnia moja pasja (2005), Kocham gotować – Magdy Gessler przepis na życie (2007) and Kuchenne Rewolucje. Przepisy Magdy Gessler (2012). She has also published articles in the Wprost and Newsweek magazines. Since 2010, she has been presenting the Kuchenne rewolucje programme, which has brought her great popularity in Poland. Since 2012, she has served as a judge on the Polish edition of MasterChef talent show. In 2016 and 2019, she made guest appearances on the MasterChef Junior Polska show.

In 2019, she was a host of the Odkrycia Magdy Gessler programme aired on Food Network TV channel. She appeared on popular TV shows such as Niania (2008) and Na Wspólnej (2014), the Polish trailer of Netflix comedy-drama Orange Is the New Black (2018) as well as Big Brother (2019). She also appeared in a reality TV show Starsza Pani musi fiknąć in 2019.

In 2021, she published her autobiography entitled Magda.

Her restaurants include: Zielnik Cafe, U Fukiera, Słodki... Słony, Ale Gloria, Venezia, Jadka (all in Warsaw), Polka in Żelazowa Wola, Kryształowa in Katowice and Santo Porto in Gdynia.

== Personal life ==
Her godfather was writer and journalist Ryszard Kapuściński. Her brother, Piotr Ikonowicz, is a left-wing politician, journalist and activist. In the 1980s, she married German journalist Volkhart Müller. After his death Magda Gessler returned to Poland and married Polish restaurateur Piotr Gessler. Her current partner is a Polish-Canadian doctor, Waldemar Kozerawski. Gessler has two children: Tadeusz and Lara.

She has declared her religion to be Eastern Orthodox. She resides in Łomianki near Warsaw. She is fluent in Spanish, German and Italian and also has a good command of English and Portuguese.

== See also ==
- List of Poles
- Polish cuisine
- Robert Makłowicz

== Sources ==
- Pietkiewicz, Małgorzata (2011). Imperium Gessler od kuchni (in Polish). Warsaw: Wydawnictwo Czerwone i Czarne. ISBN 9788377000236. OCLC 802160845.
- Gessler, Magda; Żakowska, Magdalena (2014). Magda Gessler. Autobiografia apetyczna (in Polish). Bielsko-Biała: Wydawnictwo Pascal. ISBN 9788376424200. OCLC 904767520.
- Gessler, Magda; Linowski, Dominik (2021). Magda. Autobiografia Magdy Gessler (in Polish). Warsaw: 5WHY Promotion. ISBN 9788396124111. OCLC 1262588859.
