= Sierakowice railway station =

Railway station in Pomeranian Voivodeship, Poland

Coordinates: 54.3500°N 17.8969°E

Sierakowice
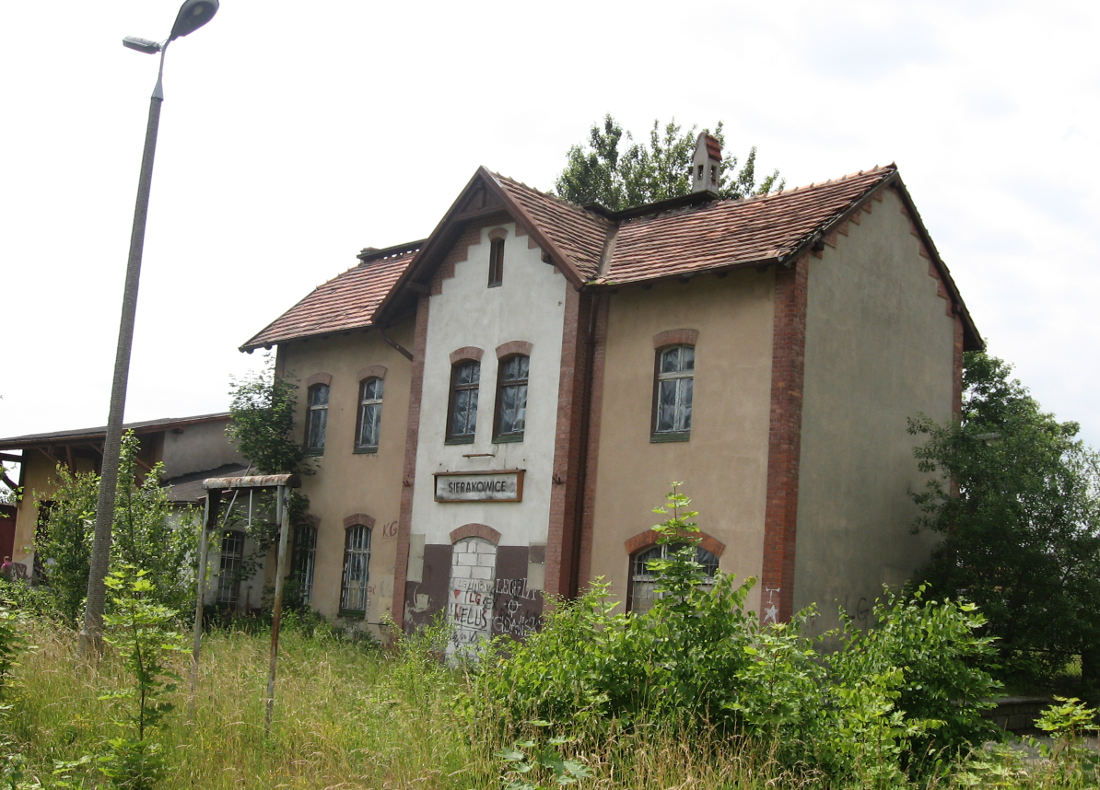

General information
- Location: Sierakowice; Poland
- Owner: Polskie Koleje Państwowe S.A.
- Platforms: 2

Construction
- Structure type: Building: Yes (no longer used); Depot: Never existed Water tower: Never existed

History
- Former names: Sierke until 1945
Location

Sierakowice is a non-operational PKP railway station in Sierakowice (Pomeranian Voivodeship), Poland.

The line of the railway can still be seen between Piwna and Skarpowa streets.

== Lines crossing the station ==
| Start station | End station | Line type |
|---|---|---|
| Pruszcz Gdański | Łeba | Dismantled |
