= Kiełpino, Pomeranian Voivodeship =

Kiełpino
- Village
- Location within Poland
- Coordinates: 54°17′24″N 18°13′30″E
- Country: Poland
- Voivodeship: Pomeranian
- County: Kartuzy
- Gmina: Kartuzy
- Population: 2,693

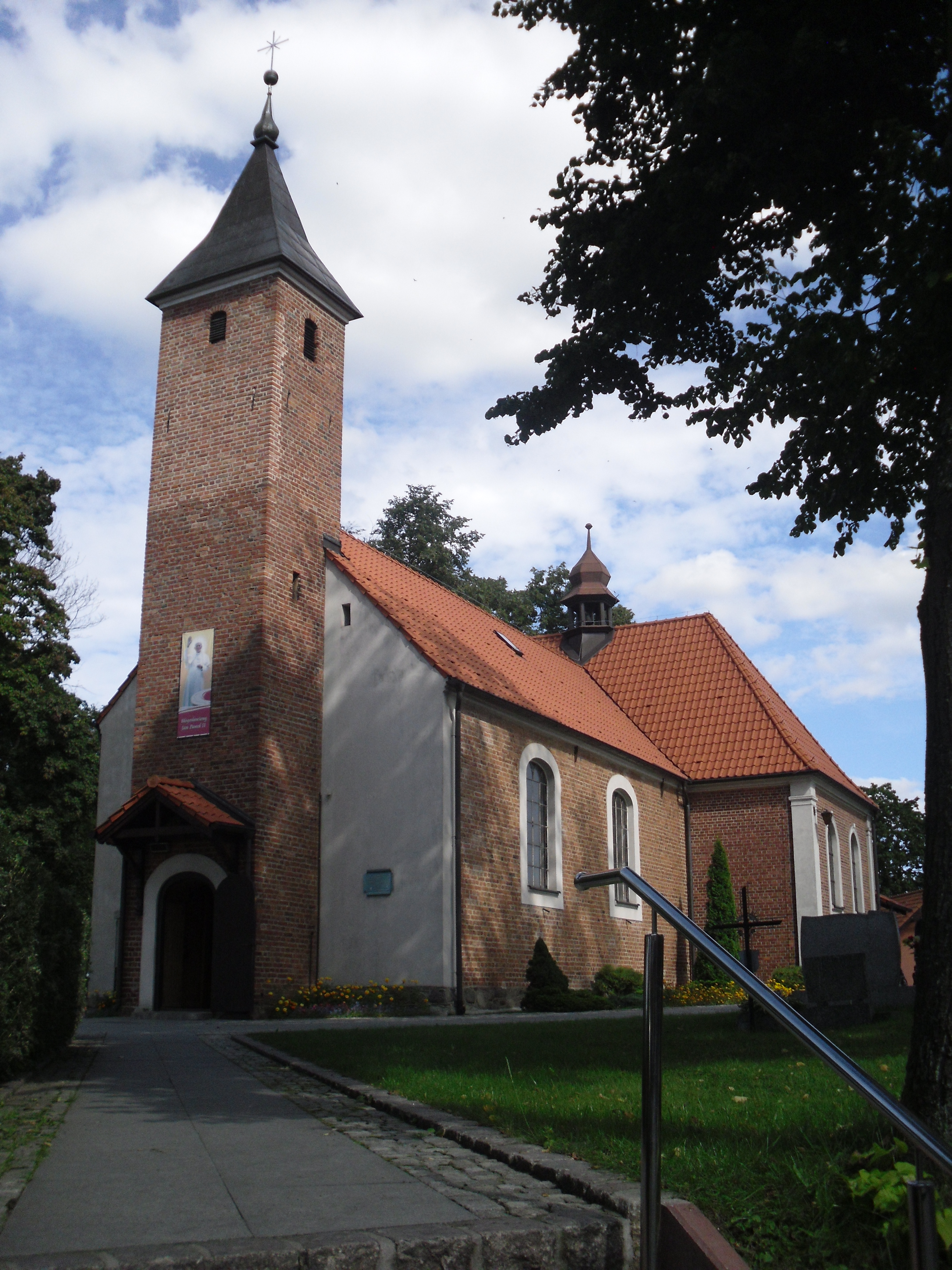
Saint Michael Archangel church in Kiełpino

Kiełpino [kʲɛu̯ˈpinɔ] (Cashubian Kôłpino) is a village in the administrative district of Gmina Kartuzy, within Kartuzy County, Pomeranian Voivodeship, in northern Poland.

For details of the history of the region, see History of Pomerania.
