= Somonino railway station =

Railway station in Somonino, Poland

Somonino
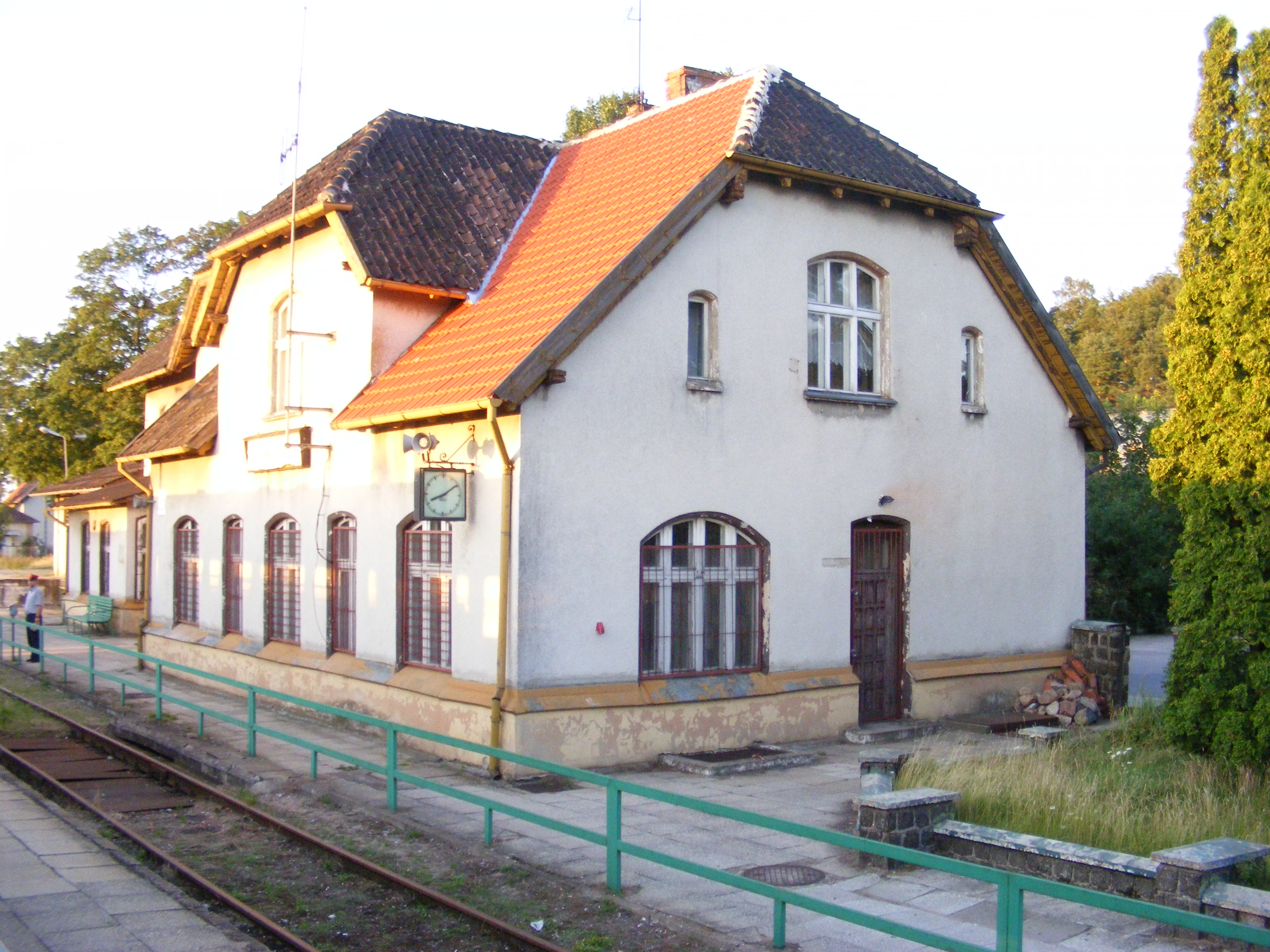
- Somonino railway station in 2007

General information
- Location: Somonino, Pomeranian Voivodeship; Poland
- System: Railway Station
- Operator: SKM Tricity
- Lines: 201: Nowa Wieś Wielka–Gdynia Port railway 214: Somonino–Kartuzy railway
- Platforms: 3
- Tracks: 4

History
- Rebuilt: 2014
- Former names: Semlin (Kr. Karthaus)
Location
- Location within Poland

Somonino railway station is a railway station serving the town of Somonino, in the Pomeranian Voivodeship, Poland. The station is located on the Nowa Wieś Wielka–Gdynia Port railway and Somonino–Kartuzy railway. The train services are operated by SKM Tricity.

== Modernisation ==
In 2014 the platform was modernised.

== Train services ==
The station is served by the following services:

- Pomorska Kolej Metropolitalna services (R) Kościerzyna — Gdańsk Port Lotniczy (Airport) — Gdańsk Wrzeszcz — Gdynia Główna
- Pomorska Kolej Metropolitalna services (R) Kościerzyna — Gdańsk Osowa — Gdynia Główna

Preceding station	Polregio	Following station
Sławki towards Kościerzyna	PR (Via Gdańsk Osowa)	Kiełpino Kartuskie towards Gdynia Główna
Sławki towards Kościerzyna	PR (Via Gdańsk Port Lotniczy (Airport) and Gdańsk Wrzeszcz)	Kiełpino Kartuskie towards Gdynia Główna
