= MasterChef (Polish TV series) =

Polish cooking game show television series

- Genre: Cooking
- Created by: Franc Roddam
- Directed by: Maciej Sobocinski (Season 1–5); Katarzyna Hummel (Season 6–8); Grzegorz Kupiec (Season 6–8)
- Judges: Magda Gessler; Michel Moran; Przemysław Klima (13-); Anna Starmach (1-12); Tomasz Jakubiak (12)
- No. of seasons: 13
- No. of episodes: 153 + 1 extra

Production
- Executive producer: Robert Komaniecki
- Producers: Ewa Leja (TVN); Małgorzata Perkowska (Endemol, from season 5)
- Running time: 45 minutes (season 1–3); 65 minutes (season 4–11)
- Production companies: TVN; Endemol Shine Polska (2012-2019); Banijay (2020-present)

Original release
- Network: TVN
- Release: September 2012 – present

Related
- MasterChef UK; MasterChef US

MasterChef is a Polish television series based on a British television cooking game show under the same title. It premiered on TVN on 2 September 2012. The show is hosted by Magda Gessler, who also hosts a Polish version of Kitchen Nightmares (Kuchenne rewolucje) on the same channel. She also serves as the head judge and is joined on the panel by Michel Moran and Anna Starmach. It was broadcast on Sundays; seasons 1–3 were at 8 p.m., while season 4 was at 9:30 p.m.

== Series overview ==
=== Currently airing franchise ===
Cycle	Season	Episodes	Premiere date	Finale date	No. of Finalists	Winner	Runner(s)-up	Judge 1	Judge 2	Judge 3	Judge 4	International Destination
MasterChef	Season 1	13	2 September 2012	25 November 2012	14	Barbara "Basia" Ritz	Kinga Paruzel	Magda Gessler	Michel Moran	Anna Starmach	-	Barcelona, Spain
MasterChef	Season 2	14	1 September 2013	1 December 2013	14	Beata Śniechowska	Maria Ożga	Magda Gessler	Michel Moran	Anna Starmach	-	Tanger; Fez, Morocco
MasterChef	Season 3	14	7 September 2014	7 December 2014	14	Dominika Wójciak	Karina Zuchora	Magda Gessler	Michel Moran	Anna Starmach	-	Palermo; Cefalù, Italy
MasterChef	Season 4	14	6 September 2015	13 December 2015	14	Damian Kordas	Adam Kozanecki	Magda Gessler	Michel Moran	Anna Starmach	-	New York City, United States
MasterChef	Season 5	14	4 September 2016	4 December 2016	14	Magdalena Nowaczewska	Michał Fabiszewski	Magda Gessler	Michel Moran	Anna Starmach	-	Cartagena; Bogotá, Colombia
MasterChef	Season 6	14	10 September 2017	9 December 2017	14	Mateusz Zielonka	Mateusz Güncel	Magda Gessler	Michel Moran	Anna Starmach	-	Sydney, Australia
MasterChef	Season 7	14	9 September 2018	10 December 2018	14	Aleksandra Nguyen	Laurentiu Zediu	Magda Gessler	Michel Moran	Anna Starmach	-	Singapore
MasterChef	Season 8	14	8 September 2019	8 December 2019	14	Grzegorz Zawierucha	Magdalena Waś	Magda Gessler	Michel Moran	Anna Starmach	-	Mexico City, Mexico
MasterChef	Season 9	14	6 September 2020	6 December 2020	15	Aleksandra Juszkiewicz	Sylwia Garska-Chmarycz	Magda Gessler	Michel Moran	Anna Starmach	-	None
MasterChef	Season 10	13	12 September 2021	5 December 2021	14	Maciej Regulski	Mariusz Kisiel	Magda Gessler	Michel Moran	Anna Starmach	-	San Sebastián, Spain
MasterChef	Season 11	14	4 September 2022	4 December 2022	15	Jakub Tomaszczyk	Bartosz Nowak	Magda Gessler	Michel Moran	Anna Starmach	-	Tuscany, Italy
MasterChef	Season 12	14	2 September 2023	10 December 2023	14	Joanna Szymanowska	Karolina Grzelak	Magda Gessler	Michel Moran	Anna Starmach	Tomasz Jakubiak ^{†}	Lyon, France
MasterChef	Season 13	12	1 September 2024	17 November 2024	18	Julia Cichocka	Debora Warchoł	Magda Gessler	Michel Moran	Przemysław Klima	-	Athens, Greece
MasterChef	Season 14	12	7 September 2025	25 November 2025	22	Wiktoria Nawara	Sylwia Skłodowska	Magda Gessler	Michel Moran	Przemysław Klima	-	Andalusia, Spain
MasterChef	Season 15	12	September 2026	November 2026	22			Magda Gessler	Michel Moran	Przemysław Klima	Pascal Brodnicki	

=== Franchise no longer in production ===
Cycle	Season	Episodes	Premiere date	Finale date	No. of Finalists	Winner	Runner(s)-up	Judge 1	Judge 2	Judge 3
MasterChef Junior	Season 1	10	21 February 2016	24 April 2016	14	Natalia Paździor	Jakub Tomaszczyk	Mateusz Gessler	Anna Starmach	Michel Moran
MasterChef Junior	Season 2	10	19 February 2017	7 May 2017	15	Julia Cymbaluk	Zofia Zaborowska	Mateusz Gessler	Anna Starmach	Michel Moran
MasterChef Junior	Season 3	10	4 March 2018	13 May 2018	15	Bartosz Kwiecień	Anika Ćwiek	Mateusz Gessler	Anna Starmach	Michel Moran
MasterChef Junior	Season 4	10	3 March 2019	5 May 2019	16	Paulina Foremny	Aleksander Multan; Jakub Nowak	Mateusz Gessler	Anna Starmach	Michel Moran
MasterChef Junior	Season 5	10	8 March 2020	10 May 2020	14	Gaja Suchocka	Franciszek Lorenc; Sonia Rudolf	Mateusz Gessler	Anna Starmach	Michel Moran
MasterChef Junior	Season 6	10	7 March 2021	9 May 2021	17	Jagoda Łaganowska	Kazimierz Józefowicz; Stanisław Zawłocki	Mateusz Gessler	Anna Starmach	Michel Moran
MasterChef Junior	Season 7	10	6 March 2022	15 May 2021	17	Helena Kłobucka	Wiktoria Chmielewska; Ewa Ziemiańska	Tomasz Jakubiak ^{†}	Anna Starmach	Michel Moran
MasterChef Junior	Season 8	10	5 March 2023	7 May 2023	16	Ignacy Jabłoński	Kaja Ciąpała; Jakub Szafrański	Tomasz Jakubiak ^{†}	Anna Starmach	Michel Moran

Cycle	Season	Episodes	Premiere date	Finale date	No. of Finalists	Winner	Runner(s)-up	Judge 1	Judge 2	Judge 3
MasterChef: Teens	Season 1	8	3 March 2024	28 April 2024	14	Martyna Niemiec	Zuzanna Gutkowska Maja Klejnot	Dorota Szelągowska	Michel Moran	Tomasz Jakubiak ^{†}
MasterChef: Teens	Season 2	8	24 February 2025	14 April 2025	18	Ida Rojewska	Zofia Król	Dorota Szelągowska	Michel Moran	Guest Judges

Cycle	Season	Episodes	Premiere date	Finale date	No. of Finalists	Winner	Runner(s)-up	Judge 1	Judge 2	Judge 3
MasterChef: All Stars	Season 1	1	12 February 2017		16 (5 Teams)	Natalia Paździor; Jan Paszkowski; Maciej Koźlakowski; Mikołaj Rej	Diana Volonkhowa; Charles Daigneault; Maria Ożga; Jakub Tomaszczyk	Magda Gessler	Anna Starmach	Michel Moran
MasterChef: All Stars	Season 2	1	25 February 2018		20 (4 Teams)	Mateusz Güncel; Grażyna Kuroń; Jakub Tomaszczyk; Aleksander Dąbrowski; Mateusz Truszkiewicz	Damian Sobek; Anna Kawa-Kułyk	Magda Gessler	Anna Starmach	Michel Moran

Cycle	Season	Episodes	Premiere date	Finale date	No. of Finalists	Winner	Runner(s)-up	Judge 1	Judge 2
MasterChef: Back to the Best	Season 1	1	5 September 2021		16 (4 Teams)	Mateusz Güncel; Damian Sobek; Matteo Brunetti; Natalia Gmyrek	Martyna Chomacka; Krzysztof Bigus; Laurentiu Zediu; Mateusz Krojenka	Anna Starmach	Michel Moran

Cycle	Season	Episodes	Premiere date	Finale date	No. of Finalists	Winner	Runner(s)-up	Judge 1	Judge 2	Judge 3
MasterChef: Grill	Season 1	2	14 May 2023	21 May 2023	10	Michel Moran; Ewa Szczęsna; Damian Sobek; Laurentiu Zediu; Mikołaj Rey	Tomasz Jakubiak ^{†} Sylwia Garska – Chmarycz; Jakub Tomaszczyk; Mateusz Guncel; Mariusz Kisiel	Hela Kłobucka; Grzegorz Zawieurucha	Krzysztof Radzikowski; Krzysztof Ferenc	Jakub Szafrański; Kaja Ciąpała; Ignacy Jabłoński; Zofia Konarska; Bartosz Daroń

== MasterChef Seasons ==
=== Season I ===
Contestant	Age	Hometown	Occupation	Status	Winnings
Barbara Ritz	45	Cologne, Germany	Secretary	Winner 25 November	5
Kinga Paruzel	31	Tarnowskie Góry	Photographer	Runner-Up 25 November	6
Miłosz Wyrwicz	36	Kraków	Estate Agent	Third-Place 25 November	2
Michał Muskała	29	Warsaw	Student/Blogger	Eliminated 18 November	4
Agnieszka Sulikowska–Radi	30	Tavullia, Italy	Farmer	Eliminated 18 November	4
Jan Paszkowski	20	Warsaw	Musician	Eliminated 11 November	3
Maciej Koźlakowski	34	Nowy Targ	DJ	Eliminated 4 November	2
Magdalena Mierzwińska	33	Warsaw	Housewife	Eliminated 28 October	1
Idir Makoudi	34	Kraków	Corporate Manager	Eliminated 21 October	0
Mikołaj Rey	30	Kraków	MMA Trainer	Eliminated 14 October; Returned 7 October; Eliminated 30 September	0
Błażej Koperski	28	Mszczonów	Employee of Funeral Organization	Eliminated 7 October	0
Aleksandra Niparko	18	Przylep	Student	Withdrew 7 October	1
Michał Kwaśnik	27	Gdańsk	Manager	Eliminated 23 September	0
Monika Goździalska	32	Warsaw	Model	Eliminated 23 September	0

==== Elimination table ====
Place	Contestant	Episode													
Place	Contestant	4		5	6		7	8		9	10	11	12		13
1	Barbara	IN	IN	WIN	HIGH	HIGH	WIN	IN	IN	IN	IN	WIN	WIN	IMM	WINNER
2	Kinga	IN	IN	WIN	IN	WIN	WIN	WIN	IMM	HIGH	LOW	WIN	IN	WIN	RUNNER-UP
3	Miłosz	WIN	IMM	LOW	IN	IN	LOW	LOW	IN	IN	HIGH	WIN	HIGH	LOW	THIRD
4	Michał M.	IN	HIGH	WIN	LOW	LOW	WIN	LOW	WIN	HIGH	WIN	WIN	HIGH	ELIM	
4	Agnieszka	IN	HIGH	WIN	WIN	IMM	WIN	HIGH	LOW	LOW	HIGH	LOW	IN	ELIM	
6	Jan	IN	IN	WIN	IN	IN	WIN	IN	IN	WIN	LOW	ELIM			
7	Maciej	IN	WIN	LOW	IN	IN	WIN	HIGH	IN	LOW	ELIM				
8	Magdalena	IN	IN	WIN	IN	IN	LOW	IN	IN	ELIM					
9	Idir	HIGH	IN	IN	HIGH	IN	NPT	LOW	ELIM						
10	Mikołaj	HIGH	LOW	ELIM	LOW	LOW	ELIM								
11	Błażej	IN	IN	IN	LOW	ELIM									
12	Aleksandra	IN	IN	WIN	WDR										
13	Michał K.	IN	ELIM												
13	Monika	IN	ELIM												

(WINNER) This chef won the competition.
(RUNNER-UP) This chef received second place in the competition.
(WIN) The chef won the individual challenge (Mystery Box Challenge or Invention Test) and received an advantage in the next challenge.
(WIN) The chef was on the winning team in the Team Challenge and was safe from the Pressure Test.
(IMM) The chef won the Mystery Box Challenge and did not have to compete in the Elimination Test.
(HIGH) The chef was one of the top entries in the individual challenge, but did not win.
(IN) The chef was not selected as a top entry or bottom entry in the challenge.
(PT) The chef was on the losing team in the Team Challenge (except episode 11 — an Individual Challenge), competed in the pressure test, and advanced.
(NPT) The chef was on the losing team in the Team Challenge, but did not compete in the pressure test, and advanced.
(LOW) The chef was one of the bottom entries in an individual elimination challenge, but was not the last person to advance.
(LOW) The chef was one of the bottom entries in an individual elimination challenge, and was the last person to advance.
(ELIM) The chef was eliminated from MasterChef.
(WDR) The chef withdrew from the competition.
(ELIM) The chef was eliminated from MasterChef but returned.

Special Guests

- 6 episode – Kurt Scheller
- 9 episode – Rick Stein, Piotr Bikont, Ewa Wachowicz
- 10 episode – Joe Bastianich
- 12 episode – Jordi Cruz

==== Ratings ====
Episode	Date	Audience	Share 4+	Share 16–49
1	2 September	2 885 726	18,60%	22,80%
2	9 September	3 054 148	19,70%	24,70%
3	16 September	3 240 336	20,40%	25,90%
4	23 September	3 649 394	21,90%	28,00%
5	30 September	3 346 002	20,70%	27,80%
6	7 October	3 584 903	21,20%	27,70%
7	14 October	2 989 325	17,10%	20,70%
8	21 October	3 438 566	21,20%	28,00%
9	28 October	3 638 654	21,10%	28,80%
10	4 November	4 019 367	23,00%	31,10%
11	11 November	3 759 546	22,50%	27,70%
12	18 November	3 910 089	23,00%	29,40%
13	25 November	4 794 625	27,20%	34,60%
Average	2012	3 563 922	21,40%	27,60%

=== Season II ===
Contestant	Age	Hometown	Occupation	Status	Winnings
Beata Śniechowska	28	Wrocław	Doktorantka Politechniki Wrocławskiej	Winner 1 December	4
Maria Ożga	37	Tarnowskie Góry	Księgowa	Runner-Up 1 December	6
Diana Volonkhowa	30	Gdynia	Menadzer Restauracji	Third-Place 1 December	6
Charles Daigneault	36	Kraków	Przedsiębiorca	Eliminated 24 November	3
Daniel Hucik	24	Gdańsk	Student	Eliminated 17 November	2
Leszek Wodnicki	53	Szczecin	Właściciel Biura Nieruchomości	Eliminated 10 November	2
Anna Nowak	28	Poznań	Marketing Manager	Eliminated 3 November	2
Krzysztof Bitel	35	Pruszcz Gdański	Informatyk	Eliminated 27 October	3
Jolanta Kleser	39	Kraków	Menadzer Korporacji Farmaceutycznej	Eliminated 20 October	2
Jarosław Falkowski	41	Gdańsk	Florysta	Eliminated 13 October	1
Paweł Bednarek	26	Warsaw	Student/Model	Eliminated 6 October	1
Adam Mostowski	24	London, England	Kierownik Sklepu Rybnego	Eliminated 29 September	0
Karolina Wysocka	22	England	Studentka	Eliminated 22 September	0
Hanna Stelmaszczyk	30	Poznań	Właścicielka Sklepu	Eliminated 22 September	0

==== Elimination table ====
Place	Contestant	Episode																
Place	Contestant	4		5	6		7	8		9	10		11	12		13		14
1	Beata	HIGH	HIGH	HIGH	HIGH	HIGH	WIN	IN	LOW	WIN	HIGH	IMM	HIGH	HIGH	WIN	IMM	IMM	WINNER
2	Maria	LOW	IN	WIN	HIGH	IN	WIN	LOW	IN	WIN	HIGH	IMM	WIN	WIN	HIGH	IN	WIN	RUNNER-UP
3	Diana	IN	IN	WIN	IN	HIGH	WIN	HIGH	WIN	WIN	IN	WIN	LOW	HIGH	IN	WIN	IMM	THIRD
4	Charles	IN	IN	IMM	IN	WIN	IN	WIN	HIGH	LOW	WIN	IMM	HIGH	LOW	IN	IN	ELIM	
5	Daniel	HIGH	IN	WIN	WIN	IN	HIGH	LOW	IN	LOW	IN	LOW	LOW	ELIM				
6	Leszek	IN	WIN	LOW	IN	IN	LOW	LOW	IN	WIN	IN	LOW	ELIM					
7	Anna	IN	IN	IN	LOW	IN	WIN	HIGH	LOW	WIN	IN	ELIM						
8	Krzysztof	WIN	IN	WIN	IN	LOW	WIN	IN	HIGH	ELIM								
9	Jolanta	IN	LOW	WIN	IN	IN	WIN	IN	ELIM									
10	Jarosław	IN	LOW	WIN	LOW	IN	ELIM											
11	Paweł	IN	IN	WIN	LOW	ELIM												
12	Adam	LOW	HIGH	ELIM														
13	Karolina	IN	ELIM															
14	Hanna	ELIM																

(WINNER) This chef won the competition.
(RUNNER-UP) This chef received second place in the competition.
(WIN) The chef won the individual challenge (Mystery Box Challenge or Invention Test) and received an advantage in the next challenge.
(WIN) The chef was on the winning team in the Team Challenge and was safe from the Pressure Test.
(IMM) The chef won the Mystery Box Challenge and did not have to compete in the Elimination Test.
(HIGH) The chef was one of the top entries in the individual challenge, but did not win.
(IN) The chef was not selected as a top entry or bottom entry in the challenge.
(PT) The chef was on the losing team in the Team Challenge (except episode 11 — an Individual Challenge), competed in the pressure test, and advanced.
(NPT) The chef was on the losing team in the Team Challenge, but did not compete in the pressure test, and advanced.
(LOW) The chef was one of the bottom entries in an individual elimination challenge, but was not the last person to advance.
(LOW) The chef was one of the bottom entries in an individual elimination challenge, and was the last person to advance.
(ELIM) The chef was eliminated from MasterChef.
(WDR) The chef voluntarily withdrew from the competition.
(ELIM) The chef was eliminated from MasterChef but returned.

Special Guests

- 4 episode – Basia Ritz (season 1 winner)
- 9 episode – Rafał Targosz
- 10 episode – Marco Pierre White
- 11 episode – Grzegorz Olejarka
- 11–13 episode – Alia Al Kasimi
- 14 episode – Kurt Scheller

==== Ratings ====
Episode	Date	Audience	Share 4+	Share 16–49
Auditions 1	1 September	2 450 555	15,74%	21,73%
Auditions 2	8 September	2 415 695	16,09%	21,97%
Top 36 Boot Camp	15 September	2 896 647	17,98%	22,67%
Mystery Challenge Invention Test	22 September	2 697 774	16,65%	21,49%
Team Challenge Elimination Test	29 September	2 888 721	17,79%	23,99%
Invention Test	6 October	2 965 873	17,88%	23,34%
Team Challenge	13 October	2 822 073	17,40%	24,06%
Mystery Box Challenge	20 October	2 941 862	17,91%	23,53%
Mystery Box Challenge	27 October	3 136 116	19,17%	25,91%
Team Challenge	3 November	3 566 570	20,61%	26,17%
Invention Test Morocco	10 November	3 278 999	19,75%	25,35%
Morocco	17 November	2 848 130	17,33%	22,56%
Morocco	24 November	3 254 615	18,57%	24,16%
Final	1 December	3 937 804	22,69%	28,99%
Average	2013	3 006 471	18,32%	24,08%

=== Season III ===
Contestant	Age	Hometown	Occupation	Status	Winnings
Dominika Wójciak	29	Kraków	Geodeta	Winner 7 December	10
Karina Zuchora	24	Warsaw	Studentka AWF	Runner-Up 7 December	5
Mariusz Szwed	35	Pruszków	Bezrobotny	Third-Place 7 December	2
Dawid Budzich	18	Zabrze	Student Budownictwa	Eliminated 30 November	3
Piotr Pielichowski	38	Gdańsk	Prezes Rynku Nieruchomości	Withdrew 23 November	4
Monika Gliniak	38	Warsaw	Stewardessa	Eliminated 16 November	1
Samar Khanafer	24	Warsaw	Właścicielka Firmy Graficznej	Eliminated 9 November	3
Sylwia Malinowska	43	Dywity	Księgowa/Bezrobotna	Eliminated 2 November	2
Julien Sacher	36	Katowice	Informatyk	Eliminated 26 October	1
Arkadiusz Paciorek	27	Bielsko-Biała	Kierownik Sklepu	Eliminated 19 October	1
Przemysław Gregorczyk	31	Łódź	Informatyk	Eliminated 12 October	0
Dorota Panfil	42	Stefanowo	Pracownik Magazynu	Eliminated 5 October	0
Tomasz Kalinowski	23	Kraków	Student Informatyki AGH	Eliminated 5 October	0
Sylwia Chrzanowska	28	Warsaw	Doradca w Instytucji Rozwoju Biznesu	Eliminated 28 September	0

==== Elimination table ====
Place	Contestant	Episode																		
Place	Contestant	4		5		6	7		8		9	10		11		12	13		14	
1	Dominika	HIGH	WIN	IN	LOW	WIN	WIN	IN	IN	WIN	WIN	WIN	IMM	IN	LOW	WIN	WIN	IMM	WIN	WINNER
2	Karina	IN	IN	WIN	IMM	WIN	HIGH	LOW	HIGH	IMM	WIN	HIGH	HIGH	WIN	IMM	LOW	IN	WIN	LOW	RUNNER-UP
3	Mariusz	IN	IN	IN	IN	IN	IN	IMM	IN	LOW	WIN	IN	LOW	HIGH	IN	LOW	WIN	IMM	THIRD	
4	Dawid	WIN	IMM	HIGH	WIN	HIGH	IN	LOW	HIGH	IMM	WIN	IN	HIGH	HIGH	IN	IN	IN	ELIM		
5	Piotr	LOW	HIGH	IN	WIN	WIN	HIGH	HIGH	IN	LOW	WIN	IN	LOW	IN	WIN	WDR				
6	Monika	IN	LOW	HIGH	IN	LOW	IN	IMM	IN	HIGH	LOW	IN	WIN	IN	ELIM					
7	Samar	IN	IN	IN	IN	WIN	IN	HIGH	WIN	IMM	WIN	HIGH	ELIM							
8	Sylwia M.	IN	HIGH	IN	IN	WIN	IN	WIN	IN	IMM	ELIM									
9	Julien	LOW	LOW	IN	IN	WIN	IN	IMM	LOW	ELIM										
10	Arkadiusz	IN	IN	IN	LOW	WIN	IN	ELIM												
11	Przemysław	HIGH	IMM	IN	IN	ELIM														
12	Dorota	IN	IN	IN	ELIM															
12	Tomasz	LOW	IN	IN	ELIM															
14	Sylwia C.	IN	ELIM																	

(WINNER) This chef won the competition.
(RUNNER-UP) This chef received second place in the competition.
(WIN) The chef won the individual challenge (Mystery Box Challenge or Invention Test) and received an advantage in the next challenge.
(WIN) The chef was on the winning team in the Team Challenge or Duet Challenge and was safe from the Pressure Test.
(IMM) The chef won the Mystery Box Challenge and did not have to compete in the Elimination Test.
(HIGH) The chef was one of the top entries in the individual challenge, but did not win.
(IN) The chef was not selected as a top entry or bottom entry in the challenge.
(PT) The chef was on the losing team in the Team Challenge, competed in the pressure test, and advanced.
(NPT) The chef was on the losing team in the Team Challenge, but did not compete in the pressure test, and advanced.
(LOW) The chef was one of the bottom entries in an individual elimination challenge, but was not the last person to advance.
(LOW) The chef was one of the bottom entries in an individual elimination challenge, and was the last person to advance.
(ELIM) The chef was eliminated from MasterChef.
(WDR) The chef withdrew due to illness or personal reason.
(ELIM) The chef was eliminated from MasterChef but returned.

Special Guests

- 6 episode – Beata Śniechowska (season 2 winner)
- 7 episode – Gordon Ramsay
- 8 episode – Michel Roux
- 11 episode – Chun Fai Tsang
- 13 episode – Ciccio Sultano

==== Ratings ====
Episode	Date	Audience	Share 4+	Share 16–49
1	7 September	2 830 648	18,51%	24,75%
2	14 September	2 382 466	15,17%	20,65%
3	21 September	2 180 000		14,21%
4	28 September	2 769 606	16,60%	22,04%
5	5 October	3 061 597	17,68%	22,87%
6	12 October			21,16%
7	19 October	3 053 818	18,08%	22,26%
8	26 October			21,90%
9	2 November	2 973 303	16,59%	20,43%
10	9 November	3 258 984	19,01%	22,85%
11	16 November	3 197 719	17,95%	21,80%
12	23 November	3 098 222		22,33%
13	30 November	3 124 635	17.82%	
14	7 December	3 412 185	19.54%	24.72%
Average	2014	2 875 079	16.94%	21.64%

=== Season IV ===
Contestant	Age	Hometown	Occupation	Status	Winnings
Damian Kordas	22	Wrocław	Veterinary student	Winner 13 December	5
Adam Kozanecki	31	Uniejów	Teacher	Runner-Up 13 December	6
Klaudia Budny	27	Łódź	Accountant	Eliminated 6 December	4
Mateusz Nowak	29	Radom	Employee of the family business	Eliminated 6 December	5
Tomasz Strzelczyk	40	Silkeborg	Pilarz	Eliminated 29 November	2
Ludwika Dąbrowska	33	Łosino	Head of commercial corporations	Eliminated 22 November	1
Rafał Sarnowski	44	Łomianki	Sales Representative	Eliminated 15 November	1
Katarzyna Byczko	31	Rogoźnica	The owner of the farm	Eliminated 8 November	3
Janina Górnicka	68	Ratno Górne	Pensioner	Eliminated 1 November	0
Arkadiusz Skwarczewski	35	Dublin	The owner of the transport company	Eliminated 25 October	2
Patryk Harmułowicz	24	Warsaw	A student of journalism and sociology	Eliminated 18 October	1
Jakub Łukaszonek	21	Strzegom	Student nutrition	Eliminated 18 October	1
Agnieszka Poprawska	41	Wrocław	Entrepreneur	Eliminated 4 October	0
Edyta Szast	39	Dublin	Transport manager	Eliminated 27 September	0

==== Elimination table ====
Place	Contestant	Episode																		
Place	Contestant	4		5	6		7	8		9			10		11		12	13		14
1	Damian	IN	HIGH	WIN	IN	IN	WIN	LOW	WIN	LOW	IN	HIGH	IN	IN	HIGH	LOW	WIN	IN	WIN	WINNER
2	Adam	WIN	IMM	LOW	WIN	IMM	WIN	IN	HIGH	WIN	IMM	IMM	HIGH	WIN	IN	WIN	HIGH	IN	IN	RUNNER-UP
3	Klaudia	IN	IN	IN	IN	HIGH	WIN	WIN	IMM	IN	WIN	IMM	HIGH	IN	HIGH	IN	LOW	WIN	ELIM	
4	Mateusz	HIGH	LOW	HIGH	HIGH	WIN	WIN	IN	HIGH	HIGH	IN	WIN	WIN	IMM	WIN	IMM	IN	ELIM		
5	Tomasz	IN	HIGH	WIN	IN	IN	WIN	IN	LOW	HIGH	IN	HIGH	IN	LOW	IN	HIGH	ELIM			
6	Ludwika	IN	IN	WIN	HIGH	LOW	LOW	LOW	IMM	IN	IN	LOW	IN	HIGH	IN	ELIM				
7	Rafał	IN	LOW	WIN	IN	HIGH	IN	LOW	LOW	HIGH	IN	LOW	IN	ELIM						
8	Katarzyna	LOW	WIN	WIN	IN	IN	WIN	HIGH	IN	IN	IN	ELIM								
9	Janina	IN	IN	IMM	IN	IN	IN	IN	ELIM											
10	Arkadiusz	IN	LOW	WIN	LOW	WIN	ELIM													
11	Patryk	IN	IN	WIN	LOW	ELIM														
12	Jakub	LOW	IN	WIN	ELIM															
13	Agnieszka	HIGH	IN	ELIM																
14	Edyta	LOW	ELIM																	

(WINNER) This chef won the competition.
(RUNNER-UP) This chef received second place in the competition.
(WIN) The chef won the individual challenge (Mystery Box Challenge or Invention Test) and received an advantage in the next challenge.
(WIN) The chef was on the winning team in the Team Challenge and was safe from the Pressure Test.
(IMM) The chef won the Mystery Box Challenge and did not have to compete in the Elimination Test.
(HIGH) The chef was one of the top entries in the individual challenge, but did not win.
(IN) The chef was not selected as a top entry or bottom entry in the challenge.
(PT) The chef was on the losing team in the Team Challenge (except episode 11 — an Individual Challenge), competed in the pressure test, and advanced.
(NPT) The chef was on the losing team in the Team Challenge, but did not compete in the pressure test, and advanced.
(LOW) The chef was one of the bottom entries in an individual elimination challenge, but was not the last person to advance.
(LOW) The chef was one of the bottom entries in an individual elimination challenge, and was the last person to advance.
(ELIM) The chef was eliminated from MasterChef.
(QUIT) The chef voluntarily left the show.
(ELIM) The chef was eliminated from MasterChef but returned.

==== Ratings ====
Episode	Timeslot	Date	Audience	Share 4+	Share 16–49
1	9.30 p.m.	6 September	2 142 020	15.46%	18.77%
2	9.30 p.m.	13 September	2 097 548	15.97%	20.09%
3	9.30 p.m.	20 September	2 049 174	15.03%	19.28%
4	9.30 p.m.	27 September			20.61%
5	9.30 p.m.	4 October			19.15%
6	9.30 p.m.	18 October		17.45%	
7	9.30 p.m.	25 October			
8	9.30 p.m.	1 November			
9	9.30 p.m.	8 November			18.99%
10	9.30 p.m.	15 November			17.68%
11	8.00 p.m.	22 November			
12	8.00 p.m.	29 November	2 454 092	14.14%	18.68%
13	8.00 p.m.	6 December	2 733 974	15.29%	
14	8.00 p.m.	13 December	3 221 922	18.72%	24.14%
Average	–	2015	2 225 397	14.82%	19.19%

=== Season V ===
Contestant	Age	Hometown	Occupation	Status	Winnings
Magdalena Nowaczewska	29	Wola Filipowska	Biomedical Engineer	Winner 4 December; Returned 16 October; Eliminated 9 October	5
Michał Fabiszewski	28	Pionki	Owner of Import-Export	Runner-Up 4 December; Returned 16 October; Eliminated 2 October	1
Anna Kawa–Kułyk	35	Katowice	Deputy Manager	Third-Place 4 December	5
Bartosz Adamski	18	Warsaw	Student	Eliminated 27 November	3
Szymon Czerwiński	32	Warsaw	Specialist fleet	Eliminated 20 November	3
Paweł Gradowski	33	Jarosław	Builder	Eliminated 13 November	5
Marta Ignasiak–Kciuk	30	Błażejowo	Doctor of Chemistry	Eliminated 6 November	2
Grzegorz Bien	19	Kalety	Student	Eliminated 30 October	2
Joanna Studnicka	37	Wieliczka	President of Foundation Largo	Eliminated 30 October	2
Marek Pukas	19	Borchów	Student	Eliminated 23 October	3
Sylwia Ładyga	29	Brzegi	Receptionist	Eliminated 16 October	3
Dominika Słowik	26	Pajęczno	Account Manager	Eliminated 2 October	0
Sławomir Sobański	27	Zielona Góra	Doctoral student	Eliminated 25 September	0
Mateusz Łuczaj	26	Warsaw	Medical Engineer	Eliminated 25 September	0

==== Elimination table ====
Place	Contestant	Episode																				
Place	Contestant	4		5		6		7		R	8		9		10		11		12	13		14
1	Magda	HIGH	IN	PT	LOW	PT	ELIM			RET	PT	IN	LOW	WIN	IN	WIN	HIGH	HIGH	WIN	IN	WIN	WINNER
2	Michał	IN	LOW	PT	ELIM					RET	PT	WIN	IN	LOW	IN	HIGH	HIGH	LOW	HIGH	HIGH	IN	RUNNER-UP
3	Anna	IN	IN	WIN	IMM	PT	WIN	IN	HIGH	IMM	WIN	IMM	HIGH	LOW	HIGH	HIGH	WIN	IMM	IN	WIN	IMM	THIRD
4	Bartosz	IN	LOW	PT	WIN	WIN	IMM	IN	IN	IMM	PT	HIGH	IN	HIGH	IN	HIGH	LOW	WIN	LOW	IN	ELIM	
5	Szymon	IN	IN	WIN	IMM	PT	HIGH	HIGH	WIN	IMM	WIN	IMM	LOW	HIGH	IN	LOW	LOW	IN	ELIM			
6	Paweł	IN	IN	WIN	IMM	WIN	IMM	IN	LOW	IMM	WIN	IMM	WIN	IMM	WIN	IMM	LOW	ELIM				
7	Marta	HIGH	HIGH	PT	WIN	PT	LOW	IN	IMM	IMM	WIN	IMM	IN	HIGH	HIGH	ELIM						
8	Grzegorz	HIGH	IN	PT	IN	WIN	IMM	WIN	IMM	IMM	PT	LOW	IN	ELIM								
9	Joanna	HIGH	IN	WIN	IMM	PT	IMM	IN	IMM	IMM	WIN	IMM	ELIM									
10	Marek	HIGH	WIN	WIN	IMM	WIN	IMM	IN	IN	IMM	PT	ELIM										
11	Sylwia	WIN	IMM	WIN	IMM	WIN	IMM	HIGH	ELIM													
12	Dominika	IN	HIGH	PT	ELIM																	
13	Sławomir	IN	ELIM																			
13	Mateusz	HIGH	ELIM																			

(WINNER) This chef won the competition.
(RUNNER-UP) This chef received second place in the competition.
(WIN) The chef won the individual challenge (Mystery Box Challenge or Invention Test) and received an advantage in the next challenge.
(WIN) The chef was on the winning team in the Team Challenge and was safe from the Pressure Test.
(IMM) The chef won the Mystery Box Challenge and did not have to compete in the Elimination Test.
(HIGH) The chef was one of the top entries in the individual challenge, but did not win.
(IN) The chef was not selected as a top entry or bottom entry in the challenge.
(PT) The chef was on the losing team in the Team Challenge (except episode 11 — an Individual Challenge), competed in the pressure test, and advanced.
(NPT) The chef was on the losing team in the Team Challenge, but did not compete in the pressure test, and advanced.
(LOW) The chef was one of the bottom entries in an individual elimination challenge, but was not the last person to advance.
(LOW) The chef was one of the bottom entries in an individual elimination challenge, and was the last person to advance.
(ELIM) The chef was eliminated from MasterChef.
(WDR) The chef voluntarily withdrew from the show.
(ELIM) The chef was eliminated from MasterChef but returned.

==== Ratings ====
Episode	Date	Audience	Share 4+	Share 16–49
1	4 September	2 095 467	13.20%	15.71%
2	11 September	1 908 076	12.30%	14.65%
3	18 September	2 250 702	13.71%	16.90%
4	25 September	2 327 666	14.32%	18.53%
5	2 October	2 331 511	13.85%	17.58%
6	9 October	2 528 174	14.87%	19.67%
7	16 October	2 507 612	14.54%	19.66%
8	23 October	2 575 677	14.74%	20.55%
9	30 October	2 542 061	14.63%	18.66%
10	6 November	2 366 352	14.63%	18.66%
11	13 November	2 479 821	13.51%	18.62%
12	20 November	2 468 579	14.00%	18.71%
13	27 November	2 498 644	14.45%	18.39%
14	4 December	3 079 591	14.18%	22.07%
Average	2016	2 425 911	14.31%	18.49%

=== Season VI ===
Contestant	Age	Hometown	Occupation	Status	Winnings
Mateusz Zielonka	31	Wrocław	Surfer/Snowboarder	Winner 10 December	7
Mateusz Güncel	20	Bytom	Technical school student	Runner-Up 10 December	4
Damian Sobek	29	Velsen-Noord, Netherlands	Production line operator	Third-Place 10 December	6
Matteo Brunetti	27	Frascati, Italy	Drone operator	Eliminated 3 December	3
Natalia Gmyrek	22	Wrocław	Student	Eliminated 26 November	4
Grażyna Kuroń	21	Izabelin	Student	Eliminated 19 November; Returned 19 November; Eliminated 12 November	1
Laurentiu Zediu	29	Warsaw	Engineer	Withdrew 19 November	3
Wojciech Zys	29	Chludowo	Policeman	Eliminated 5 November	2
Jagoda Misztal	26	Warsaw	Chemimist	Eliminated 29 October; Returned 15 October; Eliminated 8 October	2
Justyna Pilichowska	26	Wrocław	Hypermarket employee	Eliminated 22 October; Returned 15 October; Eliminated 1 October	0
Marta Jankowska	27	Kamionki	Entrepreneur	Eliminated 15 October	1
Nikoletta Koszek	26	Warsaw	Sales coordinator	Eliminated 1 October	0
Andrzej Skupień	24	Biały Dunajec	Bank employee	Eliminated 1 October	0
Sara Borowiak	23	Poznań	Nail stylist	Eliminated 23 September	0

==== Elimination table ====
Place	Contestant	Episode																					
Place	Contestant	3		4		5		6		7		8		9		10		11		12	13		14
1	Mateusz Z.	IN	IN	IN	LOW	PT	IN	IMM	IN	WIN	IMM	IN	IN	WIN	WIN	WIN	IMM	HIGH	HIGH	WIN	IN	WIN	WINNER
2	Mateusz G.	IN	HIGH	LOW	IN	WIN	IMM	IMM	HIGH	WIN	IMM	HIGH	IN	WIN	HIGH	IN	HIGH	IN	WIN	LOW	IN	LOW	RUNNER-UP
3	Damian	IN	LOW	IN	HIGH	WIN	IMM	IMM	WIN	PT	HIGH	LOW	WIN	WIN	LOW	IN	IN	WIN	IMM	HIGH	WIN	IMM	THIRD
4	Matteo	WIN	IMM	WIN	IMM	PT	IN	IMM	IN	PT	LOW	HIGH	IN	WIN	HIGH	IN	LOW	IN	LOW	IN	IN	ELIM	
5	Natalia	WIN	IMM	HIGH	IN	WIN	IMM	IMM	HIGH	WIN	IMM	LOW	IN	PT	LOW	HIGH	WIN	IN	HIGH	ELIM			
6	Grażyna	IN	IN	HIGH	HIGH	PT	IN	IMM	IN	WIN	IMM	LOW	LOW	PT	IN	IN	ELIM		ELIM				
7	Laurentiu	IN	HIGH	IN	IN	WIN	IMM	IMM	LOW	PT	WIN	IN	WIN	PT	IN	HIGH	IMM	WDR					
8	Wojciech	WIN	IMM	LOW	HIGH	PT	IN	IMM	LOW	PT	LOW	WIN	IMM	PT	ELIM								
9	Jagoda	IN	IN	IN	WIN	PT	ELIM		HIGH	WIN	IMM	LOW	ELIM										
10	Justyna	IN	LOW	ELIM				RET	IN	PT	ELIM												
11	Marta	IN	IN	IN	LOW	WIN	IMM	IMM	ELIM														
12	Nikoletta	IN	IN	IN	ELIM																		
12	Andrzej	IN	HIGH	IN	ELIM																		
14	Sara	IN	ELIM																				

(WINNER) This chef won the competition.
(RUNNER-UP) This chef received second place in the competition.
(WIN) The chef won the individual challenge (Mystery Box Challenge or Invention Test) and received an advantage in the next challenge.
(WIN) The chef was on the winning team in the Team Challenge and was safe from the Pressure Test.
(IMM) The chef won the Mystery Box Challenge and did not have to compete in the Elimination Test.
(HIGH) The chef was one of the top entries in the individual challenge, but did not win.
(IN) The chef was not selected as a top entry or bottom entry in the challenge.
(PT) The chef was on the losing team in the Team Challenge (except episode 11 — an Individual Challenge), competed in the pressure test, and advanced.
(NPT) The chef was on the losing team in the Team Challenge, but did not compete in the pressure test, and advanced.
(LOW) The chef was one of the bottom entries in an individual elimination challenge, but was not the last person to advance.
(LOW) The chef was one of the bottom entries in an individual elimination challenge, and was the last person to advance.
(ELIM) The chef was eliminated from MasterChef.
(WDR) The chef voluntarily withdrew from the competition.
(ELIM) The chef was eliminated from MasterChef but returned.

==== Ratings ====
Episode	Date	Audience	Share 4+	Share 16–49
1	10 September	1 925 897	12.69%	18.49%
2	17 September	1 987 808	12.73%	15.69%
3	24 September	2 099 393	13.34%	17.43%
4	1 October	2 249 611	14.43%	19.93%
5	8 October	2 381 554	13.84%	17.54%
6	15 October	2 078 287	13.32%	16.82%
7	22 October	2 310 460	14.07%	17.90%
8	29 October	2 664 809	15.87%	20.83%
9	5 November	2 540 387	15.40%	20.47%
10	12 November	2 624 317	15.71%	21.57%
11	19 November	2 768 744	16.28%	21.95%
12	26 November	2 473 645	14.71%	18.79%
13	3 December	2 410 138	14.54%	19.49%
14	10 December	3 016 110	18.04%	23.49%
Average	2017	2 395 696	14.68%	19.38%

=== Season VII ===
Contestant	Age	Hometown	Occupation	Status	Winnings
Aleksandra Nguyen	21	Warsaw	Student of finance	Winner 9 December	6
Laurentiu Zediu	31	Warsaw	Season 6 Contestant/Engineer	Runner-Up 9 December	2
Martyna Chomacka	30	Wrocław	Personal trainer	Third-Place 9 December	7
Mateusz Krojenka	27	Zbyszewice	City guard	Eliminated 2 December	2
Krzysztof Bigus	27	Wrocław	Forklift driver	Eliminated 25 November	2
Ewa Szczęsna	45	Ladispoli, Italy	Entrepreneur	Eliminated 18 November	6
Wojciech Kasprowicz	25	Wrocław	Physiotherapist	Eliminated 11 November	2
Patrycja Rygusiak	25	Poznań	Architect	Eliminated 4 November	3
Arkadiusz Prunesti	25	Poznań	Barman	Eliminated 28 October	1
Karolina Kowalewska	26	Dębiny	Unemployed	Eliminated 21 October	1
Mateusz Ratajczyk	22	Skarszewek	Entrepreneur	Eliminated 21 October	0
Natalia Maszkowska	26	Wrocław	Law student	Eliminated 7 October	0
Tomasz Borecki	28	Kraków	Actor	Eliminated 30 September	0
Bartosz Kazimierczak	21	Poznań	Student	Eliminated 23 September	0

==== Elimination table ====
Place	Contestant	Episode																						
Place	Contestant	3		4		5		6		7		8		9		10		11		12	13		14	
1	Aleksandra	IN	IMM	IN	WIN	WIN	IMM	IN	HIGH	WIN	IMM	IN	LOW	PT	LOW	IN	IN	WIN	IMM	LOW	HIGH	IN	WIN	WINNER
2	Laurentiu	IN	IMM	HIGH	IMM	PT	IMM	IN	IN	IN	HIGH	HIGH	IMM	PT	WIN	IN	HIGH	IN	IN	LOW	WIN	IMM	LOW	RUNNER-UP
3	Martyna	IN	IMM	IN	WIN	PT	IMM	IN	HIGH	WIN	IMM	IN	WIN	WIN	IN	HIGH	IN	HIGH	WIN	WIN	IN	WIN	THIRD	
4	Mateusz K.	HIGH	IMM	HIGH	IMM	PT	IMM	IN	IN	IN	WIN	HIGH	IMM	WIN	HIGH	IN	LOW	IN	HIGH	HIGH	IN	ELIM		
5	Krzysztof	WIN	IMM	IMM	IMM	PT	IMM	HIGH	IN	IN	IN	IN	IN	LOW	IN	WIN	IMM	IN	LOW	ELIM				
6	Ewa	IN	IMM	WIN	IMM	WIN	IMM	WIN	IMM	WIN	IMM	WIN	IMM	LOW	IN	LOW	WIN	HIGH	ELIM					
7	Wojciech	IN	IMM	IN	LOW	WIN	IMM	IN	IN	IN	LOW	IN	LOW	WIN	IN	LOW	ELIM							
8	Patrycja	IN	IMM	HIGH	IMM	WIN	IMM	IN	WIN	IN	IN	IN	HIGH	WIN	ELIM									
9	Arkadiusz	IN	IMM	IN	LOW	WIN	IMM	IN	HIGH	LOW	LOW	IN	ELIM											
10	Karolina	HIGH	IMM	HIGH	IMM	WIN	IMM	HIGH	IN	LOW	ELIM													
11	Mateusz R.	IN	IMM	IN	IN	PT	IN	IN	IN	ELIM														
12	Natalia	LOW	IN	HIGH	IMM	PT	ELIM																	
13	Tomasz	LOW	LOW	IN	ELIM																			
14	Bartosz	LOW	ELIM																					

(WINNER) This chef won the competition.
(RUNNER-UP) This chef received second place in the competition.
(WIN) The chef won the individual challenge (Mystery Box Challenge or Invention Test) and received an advantage in the next challenge.
(WIN) The chef was on the winning team in the Team Challenge and was safe from the Pressure Test.
(IMM) The chef won and did not have to compete in the Elimination Test.
(HIGH) The chef was one of the top entries in the individual challenge, but did not win.
(IN) The chef was not selected as a top entry or bottom entry in the challenge.
(PT) The chef was on the losing team in the Team Challenge
(LOW) The chef was one of the bottom entries in an individual elimination challenge, but was not the last person to advance.
(LOW) The chef was one of the bottom entries in an individual elimination challenge, and was the last person to advance.
(ELIM) The chef was eliminated from MasterChef.

==== Ratings ====
Episode	Date	Audience	Share 4+	Share 16–49
1	9 September	2 329 888	14.20%	21.46%
2	16 September	2 118 447	13.33%	18.42%
3	23 September	1 943 393	11.53%	15.54%
4	30 September	2 234 848	13.37%	17.86%
5	7 October	2 264 454	13.82%	20.17%
6	14 October	2 285 021	13.99%	18.89%
7	21 October	2 058 352	12.27%	17.92%
8	28 October	2 353 772	14.20%	20.10%
9	4 November	2 430 346	14.23%	21.18%
10	11 November	2 343 437	13.92%	19.12%
11	18 November	2 387 312	14.12%	18.55%
12	25 November	2 384 833	14.10%	20.15%
13	2 December	2 474 969	14.88%	19.63%
14	9 December	2 706 766	15.92%	21.82%
Avaeage	2018	2 308 822	13.89%	19.32%

=== Season VIII ===
Contestant	Age	Occupation	Hometown	Status	Winnings
Grzegorz Zawierucha	36	Entrepreneur	Warsaw	Winner 8 December	5
Magdalena Waś	42	Managing director	Piaseczno	Runner-Up 8 December	5
Marlena Cichocka	27	Production engineer	Chełmża	Finalist 9 December	6
Anna Łempicka	26	Streamer	Warsaw	Finalist 9 December	4
Mariusz Komenda	37	Electrician	Środa Śląska	Eliminated 24 November	2
Ksawery Rajter	27	Commercial analyst	Warsaw	Eliminated 17 November	4
Krystian Pawlik	41	Graphic designer	Warsaw	Eliminated 10 November	1
Dorota Wiśniewska	36	Bus driver	Galeria	Eliminated 10 November	4
Elżbieta Podraza	36	Solicitor	Busko-Zdrój	Eliminated 27 October	2
Mateusz Kopciuch	28	Manager	Wrocław	Eliminated 20 October	1
Adrian Adamczyk	28	Entrepreneur	Gorzów Wielkopolski	Eliminated 13 October	1
Hubert Paluch	33	Hairdresser	Rawicz	Eliminated 6 October	0
Justyna Christiansen	32	Stewardess	Kraków	Eliminated 29 September	0
Jan Szlachta	35	Entrepreneur	Żory	Eliminated 22 September	0

==== Elimination table ====
Place	Contestant	Episode																							
Place	Contestant	3		4		5			6		7		8		9		10		11		12	13		14	
1	Grzegorz	HIGH	IMM	IN	HIGH	PT	IN	LOW	WIN	IMM	PT	WIN	IN	LOW	WIN	IMM	IN	IN	WIN	IMM	IN	IN	IN	WIN	WINNER
2	Magdalena	IN	IN	IN	IN	WIN	IMM	IMM	HIGH	IMM	WIN	IMM	HIGH	IMM	IN	LOW	WIN	IMM	IN	LOW	IN	WIN	IMM	WIN	RUNNER-UP
3	Marlena	HIGH	IMM	WIN	IMM	WIN	IMM	IMM	HIGH	IMM	PT	LOW	HIGH	WIN	WIN	IMM	IN	IN	HIGH	WIN	WIN	IN	IN	FINALIST	
3	Anna	HIGH	IMM	HIGH	IMM	WIN	IMM	IMM	IN	WIN	WIN	IMM	WIN	IMM	IN	LOW	IN	LOW	IN	HIGH	IN	IN	IN	FINALIST	
5	Mariusz	HIGH	IMM	IN	IN	PT	WIN	IMM	IN	LOW	PT	HIGH	IN	HIGH	IN	WIN	IN	IN	IN	HIGH	ELIM				
6	Ksawery	WIN	IMM	IN	WIN	PT	IN	LOW	IN	WIN	PT	LOW	HIGH	LOW	WIN	IMM	IN	IN	IN	ELIM					
7	Krystian	IN	LOW	IN	HIGH	PT	IN	LOW	IN	IN	WIN	IMM	IN	HIGH	IN	LOW	IN	ELIM							
7	Dorota	HIGH	IMM	HIGH	IMM	WIN	IMM	IMM	IN	WIN	WIN	IMM	HIGH	IMM	WIN	IMM	IN	ELIM							
9	Elżbieta	IN	HIGH	IN	IN	WIN	IMM	IMM	IN	IN	WIN	IMM	IN	ELIM											
10	Mateusz	HIGH	IMM	IN	HIGH	PT	IN	WIN	IN	LOW	PT	ELIM													
11	Adrian	IN	HIGH	IN	LOW	WIN	IMM	IMM	IN	ELIM															
13	Hubert	IN	HIGH	IN	LOW	PT	IN	ELIM																	
13	Justyna	IN	IN	IN	ELIM																				
14	Jan	IN	ELIM																						

(WINNER) This chef won the competition.
(RUNNER-UP) This chef received second place in the competition.
(WIN) The chef won the individual challenge (Mystery Box Challenge or Invention Test) and received an advantage in the next challenge.
(WIN) The chef was on the winning team in the Team Challenge and was safe from the Pressure Test.
(IMM) The chef won and did not have to compete in the Elimination Test.
(HIGH) The chef was one of the top entries in the individual challenge, but did not win.
(IN) The chef was not selected as a top entry or bottom entry in the challenge.
(PT) The chef was on the losing team in the Team Challenge
(LOW) The chef was one of the bottom entries in an individual elimination challenge, but was not the last person to advance.
(LOW) The chef was one of the bottom entries in an individual elimination challenge, and was the last person to advance.
(ELIM) The chef was eliminated from MasterChef.

==== Ratings ====
Episode	Date	Audience	Share 4+	Share 16–49
1	8 September	2 004 193	12.83%	17.08%
2	15 September	1 836 042	12.05%	16.87%
3	22 September	1 847 700	12.00%	18.47%
4	29 September	2 009 432	12.47%	17.39%
5	6 October	2 045 149	12.38%	17.42%
6	13 October	1 521 105	9.05%	11.61%
7	20 October	1 920 005	12.21%	16.81%
8	27 October	1 886 581	11.53%	14.91%
9	3 November	2 027 550	12.28%	15.85%
10	10 November	1 690 379	10.77%	13.98%
11	17 November	1 663 747	10.35%	13.96%
12	24 November	1 944 586	11.96%	16.69%
13	1 December	1 938 553	11.67%	15.88%
14	8 December	2 346 897	14.22%	18.93%
Average	2019	1 905 785	11.84%	16.09%

=== Season IX ===
Contestant	Age	Occupation	Hometown	Status	Winnings
Aleksandra Juszkiewicz	28	Environmental education specialist	Giżycko	Winner 6 December; Returned 8 November; Eliminated 25 October	6
Sylwia Garska-Chmarycz	39	Entrepreneur	Choczewo	Runner-Up 6 December	3
Rafał Fidyt	37	Production worker	Tychy	Third-Place 6 December	4
Karolina Źródłowska	23	Marketing specialist	Łódź	Eliminated 29 November	6
Tomasz Skobel	44	Retired soldier	Radom	Eliminated 22 November	4
Diana Kashel	26	Fitness instructor	Szczecin	Eliminated 15 November	3
Katarzyna Domańska	24	Head of the clothing department	Laski	Eliminated 15 November	6
Tomasz Grabowski	26	Electronics engineer	Brzezinka	Eliminated 8 November	2
Adrian Purzycki	21	Student	Wrocław	Eliminated 1 November	2
Jan Przybył	25	Editor	Warsaw	Eliminated 18 October	3
Joanna Mrozek	36	Salesman at the gas station	Ruda Śląska	Eliminated 11 October	2
Joanna Gawłowska	24	Unemployed	Zabrze	Eliminated 4 October	1
Dorota Pieniążek	47	Owner of a construction company	Rzeszów	Eliminated 27 September	1
Iwona Kuczab	29	Recruiter	Berlin	Eliminated 20 September	0
Jacek Żydok	23	Student of physiotherapy	Pokrówka	Eliminated 20 September	0

==== Elimination table ====
Place	Contestant	Episode																								
Place	Contestant	3			4			5		6		7		8		9		10		11		12	13		14	
1	Aleksandra	WIN	IN	IMM	IN	PT	IN	IN	LOW	WIN	IMM	IN	IN	PT	ELIM			RET	LOW	HIGH	WIN	IN	WIN	IMM	WIN	WINNER
2	Sylwia	IN	–	IN	HIGH	IN	LOW	HIGH	IMM	IN	IMM	HIGH	LOW	PT	LOW	IN	WIN	HIGH	LOW	IN	LOW	WIN	IN	WIN	LOW	RUNNER-UP
3	Rafał	IN	–	WIN	HIGH	PT	IN	IN	HIGH	IN	WIN	IN	IN	PT	HIGH	IN	WIN	WIN	IMM	IN	HIGH	LOW	HIGH	IMM	THIRD	
4	Karolina	IN	–	IN	HIGH	WIN	IMM	WIN	IMM	IN	WIN	HIGH	IN	WIN	IMM	WIN	IMM	IN	HIGH	WIN	IMM	IN	IN	ELIM		
5	Tomasz	IN	–	HIGH	IN	PT	WIN	HIGH	IMM	IN	LOW	WIN	IMM	WIN	IMM	IN	LOW	WIN	IMM	IN	LOW	ELIM				
6	Diana	IN	–	IN	WIN	IMM	IMM	HIGH	IMM	IN	LOW	IN	HIGH	WIN	IMM	IN	WIN	HIGH	HIGH	HIGH	ELIM					
6	Katarzyna	WIN	WIN	IMM	IN	IN	IMM	IN	HIGH	HIGH	IN	WIN	IMM	PT	WIN	WIN	IMM	IN	WIN	IN	ELIM					
8	Tomasz	HIGH	IN	IMM	HIGH	WIN	IMM	IN	HIGH	HIGH	IN	IN	WIN	IMM	IN	IN	LOW	IN	ELIM							
9	Adrian	IN	–	IN	IN	WIN	IMM	HIGH	IMM	HIGH	IN	IN	HIGH	WIN	IMM	IN	ELIM									
10	Jan	WIN	IN	IMM	IN	IN	LOW	WIN	IMM	HIGH	WIN	IN	ELIM													
11	Joanna M.	WIN	IN	IMM	IN	PT	IN	IN	WIN	IN	ELIM															
12	Joanna G.	IN	–	IN	IN	WIN	IN	IN	ELIM																	
13	Dorota	WIN	HIGH	IMM	IN	IN	ELIM																			
14	Jacek	IN	–	ELIM																						
14	Iwona	IN	–	ELIM																						

(WINNER) This chef won the competition.
(RUNNER-UP) This chef received second place in the competition.
(WIN) The chef won the individual challenge (Mystery Box Challenge or Invention Test) and received an advantage in the next challenge.
(WIN) The chef was on the winning team in the Team Challenge and was safe from the Pressure Test.
(IMM) The chef won and did not have to compete in the Elimination Test.
(HIGH) The chef was one of the top entries in the individual challenge, but did not win.
(IN) The chef was not selected as a top entry or bottom entry in the challenge.
(PT) The chef was on the losing team in the Team Challenge
(LOW) The chef was one of the bottom entries in an individual elimination challenge, but was not the last person to advance.
(LOW) The chef was one of the bottom entries in an individual elimination challenge, and was the last person to advance.
(ELIM) The chef was eliminated from MasterChef.

==== Ratings ====
Episode	Date	Audience	Share 4+	Share 16–49
1	6 September	1 172 374	8.12%	10.91%
2	13 September	1 460 876	10.36%	13.63%
3	20 September	1 646 230	11.22%	16.21%
4	27 September	1 630 579	10.71%	15.99%
5	4 October	1 555 465	10.12%	13.87%
6	11 October	1 527 366	9.69%	12.58%
7	18 October	1 716 275	10.92%	13.64%
8	25 October	1 767 173	11.12%	14.64%
9	1 November	1 863 626	11.74%	16.01%
10	8 November	1 889 376	11.78%	16.58%
11	15 November	1 800 449	10.89%	13.67%
12	22 November	1 937 583	12.24%	16.50%
13	29 November	2 025 019	12.39%	16.26%
14	6 December	2 061 207	12.80%	16.30%
Average	2020	1 717 458	11.04%	14.81%

=== Season X ===
Contestant	Age	Occupation	Hometown	Status	Winnings
Marco Biasone	30	Director of the technical department	Gliwice		
Elżbieta Błaszczyńska	25	Art conservator	Kraków		
Kamila Kamrowska	31	Office worker	Subkowy		
Mariusz Kisiel	39	Assistant freight forwarder	Białystok		
Maciej Rogulski	23	Student	Dąbrowa Górnicza		
Renata Semeniuk	43	Babysitter	Munich		
Katarzyna Jezierska	41	Teacher	Nosibądy	Eliminated 14 November	
Arkadiusz Tomes	36	Customer Advisor	Łańcut	Eliminated 7 November	
Mateusz Pietruszewski	30	Locksmith	Nowy Tomyśl	Eliminated 31 October	
Zuzanna Lisowska	19	Student	Warsaw	Eliminated 24 October	
Roksana Bogusz	36	Director of the nursery	Człuchów	Eliminated 17 October	
Marlena Starzec	35	Owner of pet stores	Tychy	Eliminated 10 October	1
Angelika Strzebińska	29	Farmer	Zbyszewice	Withdrew 3 October	0
Łukasz Mackiewicz	31	Physiotherapy	Warsaw	Eliminated 26 September	0

==== Elimination table ====
Place	Contestant	Episode						
Place	Contestant	3		4		5		6
	Marco	WIN	IMM	IN	IN	IN	IN	
	Elżbieta	IN	IN	IN	IN	WIN	IMM	
	Roksana	WIN	IMM	HIGH	IMM	WIN	IMM	
	Katarzyna	WIN	IMM	IN	WIN	IN	WIN	
	Kamila	WIN	IMM	IN	IN	WIN	IMM	
	Mariusz	IN	HIGH	HIGH	IMM	IN	LOW	
	Zuzanna	WIN	IMM	HIGH	IMM	WIN	IMM	
	Mateusz	IN	IN	IN	IN	IN	LOW	
	Maciej	IN	HIGH	WIN	IMM	IN	IN	
	Renata	WIN	IMM	IN	IN	IN	IN	
	Arkadiusz	IN	WIN	HIGH	IMM	IN	HIGH	
12	Marlena	WIN	IMM	HIGH	IMM	IN	ELIM	
13	Angelika	IN	LOW	IN	WDR			
14	Łukasz	IN	ELIM					

(WINNER) This chef won the competition.
(RUNNER-UP) This chef received second place in the competition.
(WIN) The chef won the individual challenge (Mystery Box Challenge or Invention Test) and received an advantage in the next challenge.
(WIN) The chef was on the winning team in the Team Challenge and was safe from the Pressure Test.
(IMM) The chef won and did not have to compete in the Elimination Test.
(HIGH) The chef was one of the top entries in the individual challenge, but did not win.
(IN) The chef was not selected as a top entry or bottom entry in the challenge.
(PT) The chef was on the losing team in the Team Challenge
(LOW) The chef was one of the bottom entries in an individual elimination challenge, but was not the last person to advance.
(LOW) The chef was one of the bottom entries in an individual elimination challenge, and was the last person to advance.
(ELIM) The chef was eliminated from MasterChef.

==== Ratings ====
Episode	Date	Audience	Share 4+	Share 16–49
1	5 September	925 127	6.63%	8.68%
2	12 September	1 255 793	9.37%	12.27%
3	19 September	1 456 658	10.11%	12.56%
4	26 September	1 558 440	11.27%	16.51%
5	3 October	1 636 720	11.36%	16.89%
6	10 October	1 325 011	9.09%	13.25%
7	17 October	1 512 937	10.44%	13.66%
8	24 October	1 538 130	10.49%	14.91%
9	31 October	1 342 187	9.91%	13.08%
10	7 November	1 379 422	9.65%	13.48%
11	14 November	1 624 090	11.27%	15.78%
12	21 November	1 665 442	11.41%	15.88%
13	28 November	1 796 670	12.15%	16.71%
14	5 December	1 623 017	11.01%	14.49%
Average	2021	1 473 768	10.31%	14.18%

== MasterChef Junior Seasons ==
MasterChef
- Genre: Cooking
- Based on: Junior MasterChef
- Directed by: Maciej Sobociński (Season 1–2); Katarzyna Hummel-Cywa (Season 3–5); Grzegorz Kupiec (Season 3–5)
- Judges: Anna Starmach; Michel Moran; Tomasz Jakubiak (Seasons 7-8); Mateusz Gessler (Seasons 1-6)
- No. of seasons: 8
- No. of episodes: 80

Production
- Executive producer: Robert Komaniecki
- Producers: Ewa Leja (TVN); Małgorzata Perkowska (Endemol)
- Production company: Endemol Shine Polska

Original release
- Network: TVN
- Release: February 21, 2016 – present

MasterChef Junior is a Polish television series based on a British television cooking game show under the same title. It premiered on TVN on 21 February 2016. The judging panel is composed of Anna Starmach, Michel Moran and Mateusz Gessler. It was broadcast on Sundays at 8 p.m.

=== Season I ===
Contestant	Age	Hometown	Status	Winnings
Natalia Paździor	11	Zbludowice	Winner 24 April	7
Jakub Tomaszczyk	12	Tychy	Runner-Up 24 April	3
Zuzanna Harapkiewicz	12	Gdańsk	Eliminated 17 April	2
Karol Labuda	10	Pruszcz Gdański	Eliminated 17 April	3
Luiza Baaziz	11	Plewiska	Eliminated 10 April	3
Mateusz Truszkiewicz	9	Zielona Góra	Eliminated 10 April	4
Aleksander Dąbrowski	12	Łomianki	Eliminated 3 April	1
Bartosz Kulik	12	Chełm	Eliminated 3 April	1
Amelia Gardaś	11	Rychwałd	Eliminated 27 March	2
Daria Kuczwalska	13	Lębork	Eliminated 27 March	0
Michał Grząśko	11	Żory	Eliminated 13 March	0
Kaja Kołodziej	10	Bolesławice	Eliminated 13 March	0
Małgorzata Kocińska	8	Mierzyn	Eliminated 6 March	0
Maria Poproch	12	Wieliczka	Eliminated 6 March	0

==== Elimination table ====
Place	Contestant	Episode															
Place	Contestant	3		4		5		6			7		8		9		10
1	Natalia	IN	WIN	WIN	IN	IN	LOW	WIN	IMM	IMM	HIGH	WIN	WIN	HIGH	WIN	IMM	WINNER
2	Jakub	IN	IN	IMM	IN	IN	IN	PT	IN	WIN	HIGH	WIN	PT	WIN	IN	IN	RUNNER-UP
3/4	Zuzanna	WIN	IMM	IMM	HIGH	IN	LOW	WIN	IMM	IMM	IN	LOW	PT	LOW	IN	ELIM	
3/4	Karol	IN	IN	IMM	WIN	HIGH	WIN	PT	IN	LOW	IN	HIGH	WIN	IN	IN	ELIM	
5/6	Luiza	IN	HIGH	IN	LOW	IN	IN	WIN	IMM	IMM	WIN	IMM	WIN	ELIM			
5/6	Mateusz	WIN	IMM	IMM	IN	WIN	WIN	WIN	IMM	IMM	IN	LOW	PT	ELIM			
7/8	Aleksander	IN	LOW	IMM	IN	IN	LOW	PT	IN	WIN	IN	ELIM					
7/8	Bartosz	IN	IN	IMM	LOW	IN	IN	WIN	IMM	IMM	IN	ELIM					
9/10	Amelia	WIN	IMM	IMM	IN	IN	LOW	PT	WIN	ELIM							
9/10	Daria	IN	HIGH	IN	HIGH	HIGH	IN	PT	IN	ELIM							
11/12	Michał	IN	LOW	IMM	ELIM												
11/12	Kaja	IN	IN	IMM	ELIM												
13/14	Małgorzata	IN	ELIM														
13/14	Maria	IN	ELIM														

(WINNER) This chef won the competition.
(RUNNER-UP) This chef received second place in the competition.
(WIN) The chef won the individual challenge (Mystery Box Challenge or Invention Test) and received an advantage in the next challenge.
(WIN) The chef was on the winning team in the Team Challenge and was safe from the Pressure Test.
(IMM) The chef won the Mystery Box Challenge and did not have to compete in the Elimination Test.
(HIGH) The chef was one of the top entries in the individual challenge, but did not win.
(IN) The chef was not selected as a top entry or bottom entry in the challenge.
(PT) The chef was on the losing team in the Team Challenge
(LOW) The chef was one of the bottom entries in an individual elimination challenge, but was not the last person to advance.
(LOW) The chef was one of the bottom entries in an individual elimination challenge, and was the last person to advance.
(ELIM) The chef was eliminated from MasterChef.

==== Ratings ====
Episode	Date	Audience	Share 4+	Share 16–49
1	21 February	3 114 316	18.49%	23.39%
2	28 February	2 837 269	16.91%	20.89%
3	6 March	3 031 237	17.62%	23.65%
4	13 March	2 768 057	16.25%	21.64%
5	20 March	2 989 359	17.77%	22.60%
6	27 March	2 129 487	14.10%	17.32%
7	3 April	3 055 148	18.53%	24.30%
8	10 April	2 385 584	14.13%	17.20%
9	17 April	3 075 095	19.01%	22.20%
10	24 April	3 152 173	18.81%	22.61%
Average	2016	2 854 187	17.18%	21.62%

=== Season II ===
Contestant	Age	Hometown	Status	Winnings
Julia Cymbaluk	10	Wrocław	Winner 7 May	5
Zofia Zaborowsa	11	Zielona Góra	Runner-Up 7 May	4
Patryk Piskorz	11	Warsaw	Eliminated 23 April	5
Bruno Pluciński	10	Warsaw	Eliminated 23 April	3
Mateusz Biernat	8	Piaski	Eliminated 16 April	2
Joanna Krajniak	10	Rogozno	Eliminated 16 April	1
Antonina Kozyra	10	Warsaw	Eliminated 9 April	1
Lena Walewska	10	Warsaw	Eliminated 9 April	3
Jakub Mędrala	12	Kraków	Eliminated 19 March	2
Jacek Nowiński	10	Kraków	Eliminated 19 March	1
Iga Kawczak	11	Wrocław	Eliminated 12 March	0
Karol Migdałek	12	Wadowice	Eliminated 12 March	0
Patryk Konieczniak	11	Izabelin	Eliminated 5 March	0
Wiktoria Miłosz	11	Małęczyn	Eliminated 5 March	0
Olivia Tomaszewska	11	Kościan	Eliminated 5 March	0

Special guestes:

- Episode 3 – Natalia Paździor (MasterChef Junior Season 1 Winner)

==== Elimination table ====
Place	Contestant	Episode														
Place	Contestant	3		4		5		6		7		8		9		10
1	Julia	WIN	IMM	IN	IN	WIN	IMM	IN	LOW	PT	WIN	IN	LOW	WIN	IMM	WINNER
2	Zofia	IN	IN	IN	HIGH	WIN	IMM	IN	WIN	PT	HIGH	WIN	HIGH	HIGH	WIN	RUNNER-UP
3/4	Patryk	WIN	IMM	IN	IN	WIN	IMM	WIN	IMM	WIN	HIGH	IN	WIN	IN	ELIM	
3/4	Bruno	IN	WIN	IN	IN	PT	WIN	IN	HIGH	WIN	HIGH	HIGH	HIGH	IN	ELIM	
5/6	Mateusz	IN	WIN	WIN	IMM	PT	LOW	IN	LOW	PT	LOW	HIGH	ELIM			
5/6	Joanna	IN	IN	IN	LOW	PT	LOW	IN	HIGH	WIN	LOW	IN	ELIM			
7/8	Antonina	IN	IN	IN	HIGH	WIN	IMM	IN	LOW	PT	ELIM					
7/8	Lena	WIN	IMM	IN	LOW	WIN	IMM	IN	LOW	WIN	ELIM					
9/10	Jakub	IN	WIN	IN	WIN	PT	ELIM									
9/10	Jacek	IN	LOW	WIN	IMM	PT	ELIM									
11/12	Iga	IN	IN	IN	ELIM											
11/12	Karol	IN	IN	IN	ELIM											
13/14/15	Patryk	IN	ELIM													
13/14/15	Wiktoria	IN	ELIM													
13/14/15	Olivia	IN	ELIM													

(WINNER) This chef won the competition.
(RUNNER-UP) This chef received second place in the competition.
(WIN) The chef won the individual challenge (Mystery Box Challenge or Invention Test) and received an advantage in the next challenge.
(WIN) The chef was on the winning team in the Team Challenge and was safe from the Pressure Test.
(IMM) The chef won the Mystery Box Challenge and did not have to compete in the Elimination Test.
(HIGH) The chef was one of the top entries in the individual challenge, but did not win.
(IN) The chef was not selected as a top entry or bottom entry in the challenge.
(PT) The chef was on the losing team in the Team Challenge
(LOW) The chef was one of the bottom entries in an individual elimination challenge, and was the last person to advance.
(ELIM) The chef was eliminated from MasterChef.

==== Ratings ====
Episode	Date	Audience	Share 4+	Share 16–49
1	19 February	2 595 604	15.15%	18.66%
2	26 February	2 391 871	14.19%	18.82%
3	5 March	2 587 448	15.25%	20.18%
4	12 March	2 694 567	16.04%	22.14%
5	19 March	2 584 705	14.79%	20.04%
6	2 April	2 248 491	14.07%	19.11%
7	9 April	2 648 802	15.97%	20.61%
8	16 April	1 733 075	11.02%	12.92%
9	23 April	2 607 980	15.29%	19.28%
10	7 May	2 648 854	16.06%	20.85%
Average	2017	2 474 236	14.81%	19.31%

=== Season III ===
Contestant	Age	Hometown	Status	Winnings
Bartosz Kwiecień	11	Olsztyn	Winner 13 May	7
Anika Ćwiek	12	Warsaw	Runner-Up 13 May	4
Hanna Kandora	11	Koszęcin	Eliminated 6 May	2
Mateusz Steć	12	Warsaw	Eliminated 6 May	4
Stanisław Baumiller	11	Warsaw	Eliminated 22 April	2
Anastazja Czyż	11	Katowice	Eliminated 22 April	4
Zuzanna Bula	12	Tychy	Eliminated 15 April	1
Katsiaryna Svirydzenka	12	Wrocław	Eliminated 15 April	1
Stefania Jankielewicz	9	Poznań	Eliminated 8 April	1
Mateusz Oleksa	12	Tychy	Eliminated 8 April	1
Norbert Borowski	12	Warsaw	Eliminated 25 March	0
Gabriela Kwitkowska	11	Leżajsk	Eliminated 25 March	0
Pola Hirsh	10	Gdynia	Eliminated 18 March	0
Jakub Ożóg	12	Borek Strzeliński	Eliminated 18 March	0
Maja Tokarska	12	Strzyżowice	Eliminated 18 March	0

Special guests:

- Episode 5: Hubert Urbański
- Episode 7: Paweł Kras
- Episode 8: Tomasz Leśniak; Mateusz Zielonka (MasterChef Season 6 Winner)
- Episode 9: Łukasz Konik

==== Elimination table ====
Place	Contestant	Episode															
Place	Contestant	3		4		5		6		7			8		9		10
1	Bartosz	WIN	IMM	WIN	IMM	HIGH	LOW	PT	LOW	WIN	WIN	IMM	IN	WIN	HIGH	WIN	WINNER
2	Anika	IN	WIN	IN	HIGH	WIN	IMM	WIN	IMM	IN	IN	LOW	IN	LOW	WIN	IMM	RUNNER-UP
3/4	Hanna	IN	IN	IN	IN	IN	IN	WIN	IMM	IN	IN	LOW	WIN	LOW	IN	ELIM	
3/4	Mateusz S.	IN	WIN	IN	WIN	IN	IMM	WIN	IMM	IN	IN	WIN	IN	HIGH	IN	ELIM	
5/6	Stanisław	WIN	IMM	IN	HIGH	IN	LOW	PT	HIGH	IN	WIN	IMM	IN	ELIM			
5/6	Anastazja	WIN	IMM	IN	LOW	IN	WIN	WIN	IMM	WIN	IN	HIGH	IN	ELIM			
7/8	Zuzanna	IN	IN	IN	IN	IN	IN	WIN	IMM	IN	IN	ELIM					
7/8	Katsiaryna	IN	WIN	IN	IN	HIGH	LOW	PT	LOW	IN	IN	ELIM					
9/10	Stefania	IN	IN	WIN	IMM	IN	LOW	PT	ELIM								
9/10	Mateusz O.	IN	LOW	IN	LOW	HIGH	WIN	PT	ELIM								
11/12	Norbert	IN	IN	IN	ELIM												
11/12	Gabriela	IN	LOW	IN	ELIM												
13/14/15	Pola	IN	ELIM														
13/14/15	Jakub	IN	ELIM														
13/14/15	Maja	IN	ELIM														

(WINNER) This chef won the competition.
(RUNNER-UP) This chef received second place in the competition.
(WIN) The chef won the individual challenge (Mystery Box Challenge or Invention Test) and received an advantage in the next challenge.
(WIN) The chef was on the winning team in the Team Challenge and was safe from the Pressure Test.
(IMM) The chef won the Mystery Box Challenge and did not have to compete in the Elimination Test.
(HIGH) The chef was one of the top entries in the individual challenge, but did not win.
(IN) The chef was not selected as a top entry or bottom entry in the challenge.
(PT) The chef was on the losing team in the Team Challenge
(LOW) The chef was one of the bottom entries in an individual elimination challenge, and was the last person to advance.
(LOW) The chef was one of the bottom entries in an individual elimination challenge, but was not the last person to advance.
(ELIM) The chef was eliminated from MasterChef.

==== Ratings ====
Episode	Date	Audience	Share 4+	Share 16–49
1	4 March	1 930 001	11.57%	15.57%
2	11 March	2 080 226	12.21%	
3	18 March	2 188 964	12.73%	18.44%
4	25 March	2 160 150	13.05%	18.64%
5	1 April			
6	8 April	2 130 479	13.65%	
7	15 April			
8	22 April			
9	6 May			
10	13 May			
Average	2018	2 010 656	12.91%	14.82%

=== Season IV ===
Contestant	Age	Hometown	Status	Winnings
Paulina Foremny	10	Wrocław	Winner 5 May	7
Jakub Nowak	11	Gdynia	Runner-Up 5 May	7
Aleksander Multan	12	Ruda	Runner-Up 5 May	5
Helena Korwek	11	Śródka	Eliminated 28 April	4
Nikola Stępień	9	Katowice	Eliminated 28 April	1
Julia Misiak	11	Chechło Pierwsze	Eliminated 21 April	4
Jan Zatorski	11	Warsaw	Eliminated 21 April	2
Lena Król	9	Pruszków	Eliminated 14 April	2
Natalia Tokarska	11	Skarżysko-Kamienna	Resigned 14 April	3
Michalina Powolna	12	Szamotuły	Eliminated 7 April	2
Jan Sowiński	10	Osieczna	Eliminated 7 April	0
Aleksandra Gurba	9	Grabówka	Eliminated 24 March	0
Michał Lis	12	Wrocław	Eliminated 24 March	1
Mikołaj Cienkosz	11	Myślenice	Eliminated 17 March	0
Oskar Leśniewski	8	Suchy Las	Eliminated 17 March	0
Weronika Studnicka	11	Kraków	Eliminated 17 March	0

Special guestes:

- Episode 3: Robert Makłowicz
- Episode 4: Magda Gessler
- Episode 5: Ola Nguyen (MasterChef Season 7 Winner), Dominika Wójciak (MasterChef Season 3 Winner)
- Episode 6: Krzysztof Salwa, Ewa Drzyzga, Dominika Wójciak (MasterChef Season 3 Winner), MasterChef Season 6 Contestants (Mateusz Zielonka, Matteo Brunnetti, Damian Sobek, Natalia Gmyrek, Mateusz Güncel), MasterChef Season 7 All Top 14 Contestants (Aleksandra "Ola" Nguyen, Laurentiu "Lorek" Zediu, Martyna Chomacka, Mateusz Krojenka, Krzysztof Bigus, Ewa Szczęsna, Wojciech Kasprowicz, Arkadiusz Prunesti, Patrycja Rygusiak, Karolina Kowalewska, Mateusz Ratajczyk, Mateusz Ratajczyk, Natalia Maszkowska, Tomasz Borecki, Bartek Kazimierczak)
- Episode 7: Mateusz Zielonka (MasterChef Season 6 Winner)
- Episode 8: Andrea Camastra
- Episode 9: Mateusz Zielonka (MasterChef Season 7 Winner), Natalia Paździor (MasterChef Junior Season 1 Winner), Julia Cymbaluk (MasterChef Junior Season 2 Winner), Bartosz Kwiecień (MasterChef Junior Season 3 Winner)

Place	Contestant	Episode																	
Place	Contestant	3		4			5		6			7			8		9		10
1	Paulina	WIN	IMM	HIGH	WIN	IMM	IN	IN	WIN	IMM	IMM	IN	WIN	IMM	HIGH	WIN	WIN	IMM	WINNER
2/3	Jakub	WIN	IMM	WIN	IMM	IMM	IN	IN	WIN	IMM	IMM	WIN	WIN	IMM	IN	WIN	IN	WIN	RUNNER-UP
2/3	Aleksander	WIN	IMM	IN	IN	WIN	WIN	IMM	PT	IN	WIN	IN	IN	IN	IN	WIN	IN	HIGH	RUNNER-UP
4/5	Helena	WIN	IMM	IN	IN	WIN	IN	IN	PT	WIN	IMM	HIGH	IN	IN	WIN	IMM	IN	ELIM	
4/5	Nikola	IN	IN	IN	IN	WIN	IN	IN	PT	IN	LOW	IN	IN	IN	IN	LOW	IN	ELIM	
6/7	Julia	IN	WIN	HIGH	IN	IN	WIN	IMM	WIN	IMM	IMM	HIGH	WIN	IMM	IN	ELIM			
6/7	Jan Z.	IN	IN	IN	IN	IN	IN	IN	WIN	IMM	IMM	IN	WIN	IMM	IN	ELIM			
8/9	Lena	IN	LOW	IN	WIN	IMM	IN	IN	WIN	IMM	IMM	IN	IN	ELIM					
8/9	Natalia	WIN	IMM	IN	WIN	IMM	WIN	IMM	IMM	IMM	IMM	WDR							
10/11	Jan S.	IN	LOW	IN	IN	LOW	IN	IN	PT	IN	ELIM								
10/11	Michalina	IN	WIN	HIGH	WIN	IMM	IN	IN	PT	IN	ELIM								
12/13	Michał	WIN	IMM	IN	IN	ELIM													
12/13	Aleksandra	IN	LOW	IN	IN	ELIM													
14/15/16	Mikołaj	IN	ELIM																
14/15/16	Oskar	IN	ELIM																
14/15/16	Weronika	IN	ELIM																

(WINNER) This chef won the competition.
(RUNNER-UP) This chef received second place in the competition.
(WIN) The chef won the individual challenge (Mystery Box Challenge or Invention Test) and received an advantage in the next challenge.
(WIN) The chef was on the winning team in the Team Challenge and was safe from the Pressure Test.
(IMM) The chef won the Mystery Box Challenge and did not have to compete in the Elimination Test.
(HIGH) The chef was one of the top entries in the individual challenge, but did not win.
(IN) The chef was not selected as a top entry or bottom entry in the challenge.
(PT) The chef was on the losing team in the Team Challenge
(LOW) The chef was one of the bottom entries in an individual elimination challenge, and was the last person to advance.
(ELIM) The chef was eliminated from MasterChef.
(WDR) The chef voluntarily withdrew from the show.

==== Ratings ====
Episode	Date	Audience	Share 4+	Share 16–49
1	3 March	1 698 026	9.84%	12.84%
2	10 March	2 028 218	12.55%	16.32%
3	17 March	1 598 932	9.40%	11.71%
4	24 March	1 521 135	8.78%	10.86%
5	31 March	1 762 175	10.61%	14.52%
6	7 April	1 502 825	9.25%	11.80%
7	14 April	1 764 713	10.68%	13.05%
8	21 April	1 185 819	7.89%	9.32%
9	28 April	1 597 433	9.78%	12.17%
10	5 May	1 795 157	10.90%	12.84%
Average	2019	1 645 411	9.97%	12.54%

=== Season V ===
Contestant	Age	Hometown	Status	Winnings
Gaja Suchocka	9	Sanok	Winner 10 May	7
Sonia Rudolf	11	Warsaw	Runner-Up 10 May	6
Franciszek Lorenc	12	Kraków	Runner-Up 10 May	4
Mateusz Książko	9	Krosno	Eliminated 3 May	4
Natalia Tokarska	12	Skarżysko-Kamienna	Eliminated 3 May	3
Aleksandra Gądek	9	Andrychów	Eliminated 3 May	3
Arnold Kulmagambetow	11	Olsztyn	Eliminated 19 April	4
Wiktor Przysiężny	12	Smolec	Eliminated 19 April	2
Liliana Jarocka	11	Rotmanka	Eliminated 12 April	2
Julia Roszkowska	12	Letniki	Eliminated 12 April	2
Antonina Barcicka	9	Wysocko Małe	Eliminated 29 March	1
Jakub Paliś	11	Kraków	Eliminated 29 March	0
Maja Leonard	10	Rybnik	Eliminated 22 March	0
Karolina Downar	8	Wrocław	Eliminated 22 March	0

Special guests:

- Episode 5: Wojciech Modest Amaro
- Episode 6: Magdalena Nowaczewska (MasterChef Season 5 Winner); Damian Sobek & Mateusz Güncel (MasterChef Season 6 Finalists); Maria Ożga (MasterChef Season 2 Runner-Up); Anna Kawa-Kułyk (MasterChef Season 5 Finalist); Grzegorz Bien (MasterChef Season 5 Contestant); Jakub Tomaszczyk (MasterChef Junior Season 2 Runner-Up); Hanna Kandora, Anastazja Czyż, Mateusz Oleksa, Maja Tokarska & Zuzanna Bula (MasterChef Junior Season 3 Contestants), Nikola Stępień (MasterChef Junior Season 4 Conestants); Bartek Kulik & Michał Grząśko (MasterChef Junior Season 1 Contestants)
- Episode 8: Ola Nguyen (MasterChef Season 7 Winner)
- Episode 9: Grzegorz Zawierucha (MasterChef Season 8 Winner), Paulina Foremny (MasterChef Junior Season 4 Winner), Magic of Y

Place	Contestant	Episode															
Place	Contestant	3		4			5		6		7		8		9		10
1	Gaja	WIN	IMM	WIN	IMM	IMM	HIGH	LOW	WIN	IMM	WIN	IMM	IN	WIN	IN	WIN	WINNER
2/3	Sonia	IN	WIN	IN	HIGH	WIN	IN	WIN	PT	IN	IN	WIN	WIN	WIN	IN	HIGH	RUNNER-UP
2/3	Franciszek	WIN	IMM	IN	IN	LOW	IN	LOW	WIN	IMM	IN	WIN	IN	LOW	WIN	IMM	RUNNER-UP
4/5/6	Aleksandra	WIN	IMM	IN	IN	WIN	HIGH	LOW	PT	IN	WIN	IMM	IN	LOW	IN	ELIM	
4/5/6	Natalia	WIN	IMM	IN	IN	LOW	HIGH	HIGH	WIN	IMM	IN	LOW	IN	WIN	IN	ELIM	
4/5/6	Mateusz	WIN	IMM	WIN	IMM	IMM	IN	HIGH	WIN	IMM	IN	WIN	IN	LOW	IN	ELIM	
7/8	Arnold	WIN	IMM	WIN	IMM	IMM	HIGH	WIN	WIN	IMM	IN	ELIM					
7/8	Wiktor	IN	LOW	IN	IN	WIN	WIN	HIGH	PT	IN	IN	ELIM					
9/10	Liliana	IN	WIN	IN	WIN	IMM	IN	HIGH	PT	ELIM							
9/10	Julia	WIN	IMM	WIN	IMM	IMM	IN	LOW	PT	ELIM							
11/12	Antonina	IN	WIN	IN	IN	ELIM											
11/12	Jakub	IN	LOW	IN	IN	ELIM											
13/14	Maja	IN	ELIM														
13/14	Karolina	IN	ELIM														

(WINNER) This chef won the competition.
(RUNNER-UP) This chef received second place in the competition.
(WIN) The chef won the individual challenge (Mystery Box Challenge or Invention Test) and received an advantage in the next challenge.
(WIN) The chef was on the winning team in the Team Challenge and was safe from the Pressure Test.
(IMM) The chef won the Mystery Box Challenge and did not have to compete in the Elimination Test.
(HIGH) The chef was one of the top entries in the individual challenge, but did not win.
(IN) The chef was not selected as a top entry or bottom entry in the challenge.
(PT) The chef was on the losing team in the Team Challenge
(LOW) The chef was one of the bottom entries in an individual elimination challenge, and was the last person to advance.
(ELIM) The chef was eliminated from MasterChef.

==== Ratings ====
Episode	Date	Audience	Share 4+	Share 16–49
1	8 March	1 281 340	8.18%	10.60%
2	15 March	1 480 549	8.85%	12.09%
3	22 March	1 744 893	10.11%	13.74%
4	29 March	1 674 194	9.70%	11.68%
5	5 April	1 535 844	9.25%	12.27%
6	12 April	1 206 383	7.29%	9.07%
7	19 April	1 614 190	9.78%	12.18%
8	26 April	1 427 356	8.96%	11.39%
9	3 May	1 453 533	9.09%	12.62%
10	10 May	1 597 116	10.63%	14.49%
Average	2020	1 501 755	9.18%	11.99%

=== Season VI ===
Contestant	Age	Hometown	Status	Winnings
Jagoda Łaganowska	11	Janikowo	Winner 9 May	6
Stanisław Zawłocki	12	Pełczyce	Runner-Up 9 May	6
Kazimierz Józefowicz	9	Stary Toruń	Runner-Up 9 May	3
Oliwia Piech	12	Studzienice	Eliminated 2 May	6
Jakub Jaworski	11	Kraków	Eliminated 2 May	1
Maciej Piechowiak	10	Dychów	Eliminated 25 April	4
Lena Góra	10	Kielce	Eliminated 25 April	3
Dominik Kołodziej	10	Grybów	Eliminated 11 April	2
Piotr Sobczak	11	Katowice	Eliminated 11 April	2
Lena Świętońska	11	Warsaw	Eliminated 4 April	0
Natalia Biernacka	11	Rydułtowy	Eliminated 4 April	1
Lena Bereda-Łabędź	12	Dobczyn	Eliminated 28 March	1
Antonina Dąbek	11	Pińczyce	Eliminated 28 March	2
Maria Żebrowska	11	Giżycko	Eliminated 14 March	0
Zofia Marczak	9	Komorniki	Eliminated 14 March	0
Marta Śmigaj	10	Poznań	Eliminated 7 March	0
Mikołaj Bączkowski	12	Kuleje	Eliminated 7 March	0

Place	Contestant	Episode																				
Place	Contestant	1		2		3		4			5		6			7		8		9		10
1	Jagoda	WIN	IMM	IN	WIN	IN	IN	IN	IN	HIGH	WIN	IMM	HIGH	WIN	IMM	IN	IN	4	WIN	HIGH	HIGH	WINNER
2/3	Kazimierz	HIGH	HIGH	WIN	IMM	HIGH	IN	IN	HIGH	WIN	PT	IN	IN	WIN	IMM	IN	IN	4	IN	IN	LOW	RUNNER-UP
2/3	Stanisław	IN	HIGH	IN	LOW	IN	IN	WIN	IMM	IMM	PT	WIN	WIN	IMM	IMM	WIN	IN	4	IN	WIN	WIN	RUNNER-UP
4/5	Oliwia	WIN	IMM	WIN	IMM	WIN	IMM	HIGH	WIN	IMM	WIN	IMM	IN	IN	LOW	WIN	IN	3	IN	IN	ELIM	
4/5	Jakub	IN	LOW	IN	HIGH	HIGH	IN	IN	IN	HIGH	WIN	IMM	IN	IN	IN	IN	IN	1	IN	IN	ELIM	
6/7	Lena G.	HIGH	LOW	WIN	IMM	IN	IN	IN	WIN	IMM	PT	IN	IN	IN	WIN	IN	IN	3	ELIM			
6/7	Maciej	WIN	IMM	IN	HIGH	IN	IN	HIGH	WIN	IMM	WIN	IMM	HIGH	IN	LOW	IN	WIN	2	ELIM			
8/9	Dominik	IN	WIN	WIN	IMM	IN	IN	IN	IN	LOW	PT	IN	IN	IN	ELIM							
8/9	Piotr	IN	IN	WIN	IMM	IN	IN	IN	IN	LOW	WIN	IMM	IN	IN	ELIM							
10/11	Lena Ś.	HIGH	IN	IN	IN	HIGH	IN	IN	IN	IN	PT	ELIM										
10/11	Natalia	WIN	IMM	IN	LOW	IN	IN	IN	IN	IN	PT	ELIM										
12/13	Antonina	WIN	IMM	WIN	IMM	HIGH	IN	HIGH	IN	ELIM												
12/13	Lena B.	WIN	IMM	IN	HIGH	IN	IN	HIGH	HIGH	ELIM												
14/15	Maria	HIGH	HIGH	IN	ELIM																	
14/15	Zofia	IN	IN	IN	ELIM																	
16/17	Mikołaj	IN	ELIM																			
16/17	Marta	IN	ELIM																			

(WINNER) This chef won the competition.
(RUNNER-UP) This chef received second place in the competition.
(WIN) The chef won the individual challenge (Mystery Box Challenge or Invention Test) and received an advantage in the next challenge.
(WIN) The chef was on the winning team in the Team Challenge and was safe from the Pressure Test.
(IMM) The chef won the Mystery Box Challenge and did not have to compete in the Elimination Test.
(HIGH) The chef was one of the top entries in the individual challenge, but did not win.
(IN) The chef was not selected as a top entry or bottom entry in the challenge.
(PT) The chef was on the losing team in the Team Challenge
(LOW) The chef was one of the bottom entries in an individual elimination challenge, and was the last person to advance.
(ELIM) The chef was eliminated from MasterChef.

==== Ratings ====
Episode	Date	Audience	Share 4+	Share 16–49
1	7 March	1 308 275	8.35%	11.67%
2	14 March	1 342 777	8.65%	11.43%
3	21 March	1 517 441	9.67%	13.60%
4	28 March	1 350 738	8.48%	11.10%
5	4 April	1 155 990	7.82%	10.31%
6	11 April	1 467 838	9.63%	13.02%
7	18 April	1 554 973	10.08%	14.39%
8	25 April	1 316 306	8.76%	10.18%
9	2 May	1 157 141	8.24%	10.45%
10	9 May	1 598 776	11.39%	15.34%
2021	7 March	1 376 819	9.10%	12.14%

== Rating Figures ==
Episode	MasterChef Seasons											
Episode	I Season	II Season	III Season	IV Season	V Season	VI Season	VII Season	VIII Season	IX Season	X Season	XI Season	XII Season
1	2 885 726 (2 September 2012)	2 450 555 (1 September 2013)	2 830 648 (7 September 2014)	2 142 020 (6 September 2015)	2 095 467 (4 September 2016)	1 925 897 (10 September 2017)	2 329 888 (9 September 2018)	2 004 193 (8 September 2019)	1 172 374 (6 September 2020)	925 127 (5 September 2021)	1 045 243 (4 September 2022)	875 836 (3 September 2023)
2	3 054 148 (9 September 2012)	2 415 695 (8 September 2013)	2 382 466 (14 September 2014)	2 097 548 (13 September 2015)	1 908 076 (11 September 2016)	1 987 808 (17 September 2017)	2 118 447 (16 September 2018)	1 836 042 (15 September 2019)	1 460 876 (13 September 2020)	1 255 793 (12 September 2021)	984 287 (11 September 2022)	717 893 (10 September 2023)
3	3 240 336 (16 September 2012)	2 896 647 (15 September 2013)	2 180 000 (21 September 2014)	2 049 174 (20 September 2015)	2 250 702 (18 September 2016)	2 099 393 (24 September 2017)	1 943 393 (23 September 2018)	1 847 700 (22 September 2019)	1 646 230 (20 September 2020)	1 456 658 (19 September 2021)	1 322 163 (18 September 2022)	889 171 (17 September 2023)
4	3 649 394 (23 September 2012)	2 697 774 (22 September 2013)	2 769 606 (28 September 2014)	? (27 September 2015)	2 327 666 (25 September 2016)	2 249 611 (1 October 2017)	2 234 848 (30 September 2018)	2 009 432 (29 September 2019)	1 630 579 (27 September 2020)	1 558 440 (26 September 2021)	1 224 180 (25 September 2022)	824 558 (24 September 2023)
5	3 346 002 (30 September 2012)	2 888 721 (29 September 2013)	3 061 597 (5 October 2014)	? (4 October 2015)	2 331 511 (2 October 2016)	2 381 554 (8 October 2017)	2 264 454 (7 October 2018)	2 045 149 (6 October 2019)	1 555 465 (4 October 2020)	1 636 720 (3 October 2021)	1 378 469 (2 October 2022)	872 051 (1 October 2023)
6	3 584 903 (7 October 2012)	2 965 873 (6 October 2013)	? (12 October 2014)	? (18 October 2015)	2 528 174 (9 October 2016)	2 078 287 (15 October 2017)	2 285 021 (14 October 2018)	1 521 105 (13 October 2019)	1 527 366 (11 October 2020)	1 325 011 (10 October 2021)	1 391 276 (9 October 2022)	1 078 142 (8 October 2023)
7	2 989 325 (14 October 2012)	2 822 073 (13 October 2013)	3 053 818 (19 October 2014)	? (25 October 2015)	2 507 612 (16 October 2016)	2 310 460 (22 October 2017)	2 058 352 (21 October 2018)	1 920 005 (20 October 2019)	1 716 275 (18 October 2020)	1 512 937 (17 October 2021)	1 391 276 (16 October 2022)	1 185 544 (22 October 2023)
8	3 438 566 (21 October 2012)	2 941 862 (20 October 2013)	? (26 October 2014)	? (1 November 2015)	2 575 677 (23 October 2016)	2 664 809 (29 October 2017)	2 353 772 (28 October 2018)	1 886 581 (27 October 2019)	1 767 173 (25 October 2020)	1 538 130 (24 October 2021)	1 306 959 (23 October 2022)	1 086 212 (29 October 2023)
9	3 638 654 (28 October 2012)	3 136 116 (27 October 2013)	2 973 303 (2 November 2014)	? (8 November 2015)	2 542 061 (30 October 2016)	2 540 387 (5 November 2017)	2 430 346 (4 November 2018)	2 027 550 (3 November 2019)	1 863 626 (1 November 2020)	1 342 187 (31 October 2021)	1 121 565 (30 October 2022)	1 271 695 (5 November 2023)
10	4 019 367 (4 November 2012)	3 566 570 (3 November 2013)	3 258 984 (9 November 2014)	? (15 November 2015)	2 366 352 (6 November 2016)	2 624 317 (12 November 2017)	2 343 437 (11 November 2018)	1 690 379 (10 November 2019)	1 889 376 (8 November 2020)	1 379 422 (7 November 2021)	1 394 636 (6 November 2022)	1 293 226 (12 November 2023)
11	3 759 546 (11 November 2012)	3 278 999 (10 November 2013)	3 197 719 (16 November 2014)	? (22 November 2015)	2 479 821 (13 November 2016)	2 768 744 (19 November 2017)	2 387 312 (18 November 2018)	1 663 747 (17 November 2019)	1 800 449 (15 November 2020)	1 624 090 (14 November 2021)	1 462 095 (13 November 2022)	1 321 214 (19 November 2023)
12	3 910 089 (18 November 2012)	2 848 130 (17 November 2013)	3 098 222 (23 November 2014)	2 454 092 (29 November 2015)	2 468 579 (20 November 2016)	2 473 645 (26 November 2017)	2 384 833 (25 November 2018)	1 944 586 (24 November 2019)	1 937 583 (22 November 2020)	1 665 442 (21 November 2021)	1 491 844 (20 November 2022)	1 052 064 (26 November 2023)
13	4 794 625 (25 November 2012)	3 254 615 (24 November 2013)	3 124 635 (30 November 2014)	2 733 974 (6 December 2015)	2 498 644 (27 November 2016)	2 410 138 (3 December 2017)	2 474 969 (2 December 2018)	1 938 553 (1 December 2019)	2 025 019 (29 November 2020)	1 796 670 (28 November 2021)	1 279 969 (27 November 2022)	1 279 122 (3 December 2023)
14	–	3 937 804 (1 December 2013)	3 412 185 (7 December 2014)	3 221 922 (13 December 2015)	3 079 591 (4 December 2016)	3 016 110 (10 December 2017)	2 706 766 (9 December 2018)	2 346 897 (8 December 2019)	2 061 207 (6 December 2020)	1 623 017 (5 December 2021)	1 420 892 (4 December 2022)	968 535 (10 December 2023)
Average	3 563 922	3 006 471	2 875 079	2 225 397	2 425 911	2 395 696	2 308 822	1 905 785	1 717 458	1 473 768	1 301 119	1 046 037

Episode	MasterChef Junior Seasons							
Episode	I Season	II Season	III Season	IV Season	V Season	VI Season	VII Season	VII Season
1	3 114 316 (21 February 2016)	2 595 604 (19 February 2017)	1 930 001 (4 March 2018)	1 698 026 (3 March 2019)	1 281 340 (8 March 2020)	1 308 275 (7 March 2021)	1 135 785 (6 March 2022)	1 153 500 (5 March 2023)
2	2 837 269 (28 February 2016)	2 391 871 (26 February 2017)	2 080 226 (11 March 2018)	2 028 218 (10 March 2019)	1 480 549 (15 March 2020)	1 342 777 (14 March 2021)	1 276 530 (13 March 2022)	1 167 148 (12 March 2023)
3	3 031 237 (6 March 2016)	2 587 448 (5 March 2017)	2 188 964 (18 March 2018)	1 598 932 (17 March 2019)	1 744 893 (22 March 2020)	1 517 441 (21 March 2021)	1 049 963 (27 March 2022)	1 212 741 (19 March 2023)
4	2 768 057 (13 March 2016)	2 694 567 (12 March 2017)	2 160 150 (25 March 2018)	1 521 135 (24 March 2019)	1 674 194 (29 March 2020)	1 350 738 (28 March 2021)	1 171 841 (3 April 2022)	1 217 565 (26 March 2023)
5	2 989 359 (20 March 2016)	2 584 705 (19 March 2017)	? (1 April 2018)	1 762 175 (31 March 2019)	1 535 844 (5 April 2020)	1 155 990 (4 April 2021)	1 124 503 (10 April 2022)	1 112 616 (2 April 2023)
6	2 129 487 (27 March 2016)	2 248 491 (2 April 2017)	2 130 479 (8 April 2018)	1 502 825 (7 April 2019)	1 206 383 (12 April 2020)	1 467 838 (11 April 2021)	845 611 (17 April 2022)	752 901 (9 April 2023)
7	3 055 148 (3 April 2016)	2 648 802 (9 April 2017)	? (15 April 2018)	1 764 713 (14 April 2019)	1 614 190 (19 April 2020)	1 554 973 (18 April 2021)	1 155 176 (24 April 2022)	1 109 541 (16 April 2023)
8	2 385 584 (10 April 2016)	1 733 075 (16 April 2017)	? (22 April 2018)	1 185 819 (21 April 2019)	1 427 356 (26 April 2020)	1 316 306 (25 April 2021)	862 696 (1 May 2022)	1 047 260 (23 April 2023)
9	3 075 095 (17 April 2016)	2 607 980 (23 April 2017)	? (6 May 2018)	1 597 433 (28 April 2019)	1 453 533 (3 May 2020)	1 157 141 (2 May 2021)	1 072 077 (8 May 2022)	858 470 (30 April 2023)
10	3 152 173 (24 April 2016)	2 648 854 (7 May 2017)	? (13 May 2018)	1 795 157 (5 May 2019)	1 597 116 (10 May 2020)	1 598 776 (9 May 2021)	990 032 (15 May 2022)	1 209 591 (7 May 2023)
Average	2 854 187	2 474 236	2 010 656	1 645 411	1 501 755	1 376 819	1 068 407	1 085 152
