= Glinno, Poznań County =

Glinno
- Village
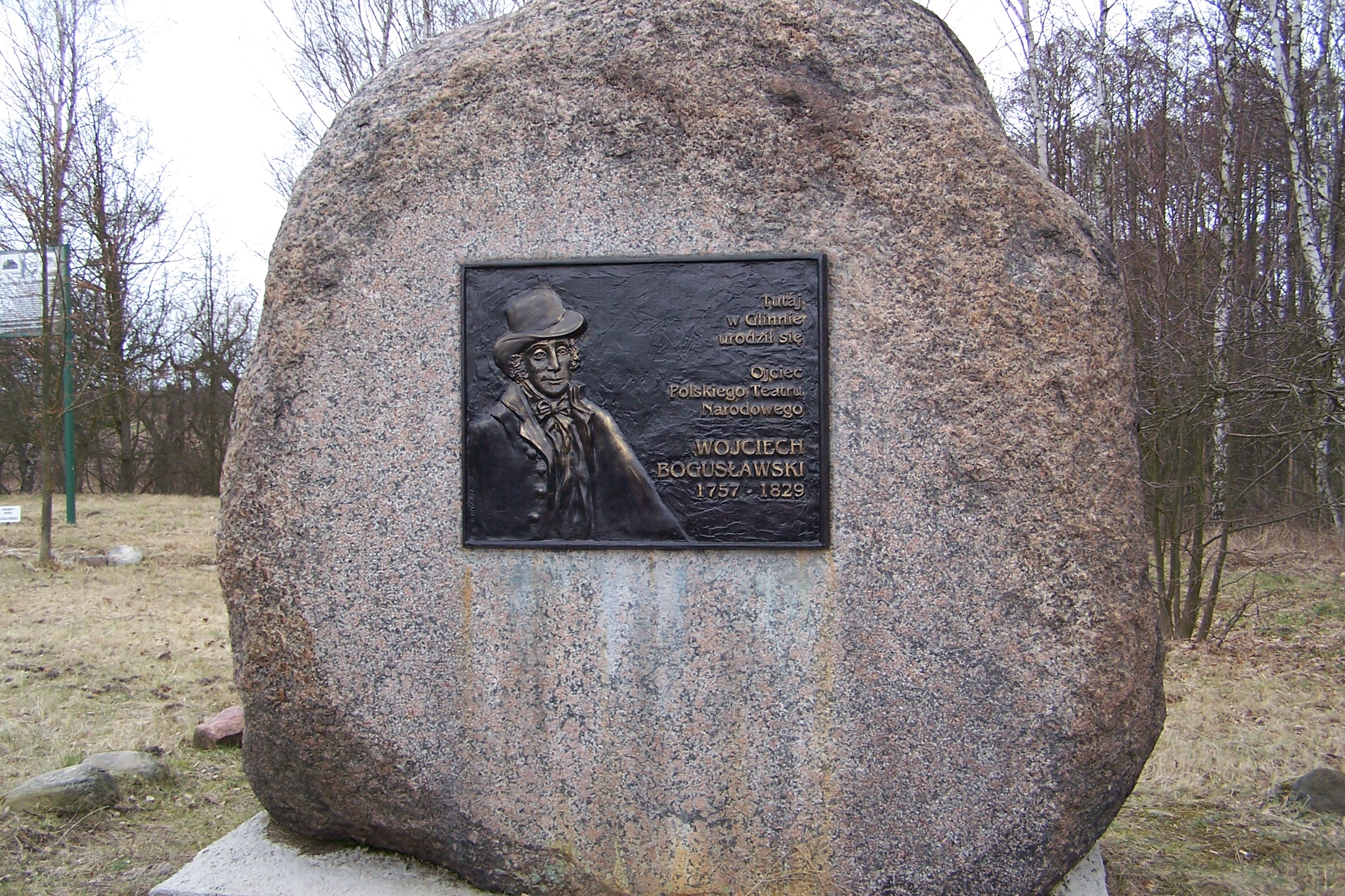
- Memorial plaque to Polish theatre director Wojciech Bogusławski, who was born in the village

- Location within Poland
- Coordinates: 52°30′N 16°53′E
- Country: Poland
- Voivodeship: Greater Poland
- County: Poznań
- Gmina: Suchy Las
- Population: 0

Glinno [ˈɡlinnɔ] is a former village in the administrative district of Gmina Suchy Las, within Poznań County, Greater Poland Voivodeship, in west-central Poland.

The site of the village is now within the area of the military training ground centred on Biedrusko.
