= Okalewo, Greater Poland Voivodeship =

Okalewo
- Village
- Location within Poland
- Coordinates: 52°30′54″N 16°55′13″E
- Country: Poland
- Voivodeship: Greater Poland
- County: Poznań
- Gmina: Suchy Las
- Population: 0

Okalewo [ɔkaˈlɛvɔ] is a former village in the administrative district of Gmina Suchy Las, within Poznań County, Greater Poland Voivodeship, in west-central Poland.

The site of the village is now within the area of the military training ground centred on Biedrusko.
