= Złotniki, Poznań County =

Złotniki
- Village
- Location within Poland
- Coordinates: 52°29′N 16°50′E
- Country: Poland
- Voivodeship: Greater Poland
- County: Poznań
- Gmina: Suchy Las
- Population: 1,100

Złotniki [zwɔtˈniki] is a village in the administrative district of Gmina Suchy Las, within Poznań County, Greater Poland Voivodeship, in west-central Poland.
