= Chojnica, Greater Poland Voivodeship =

Chojnica
- Village
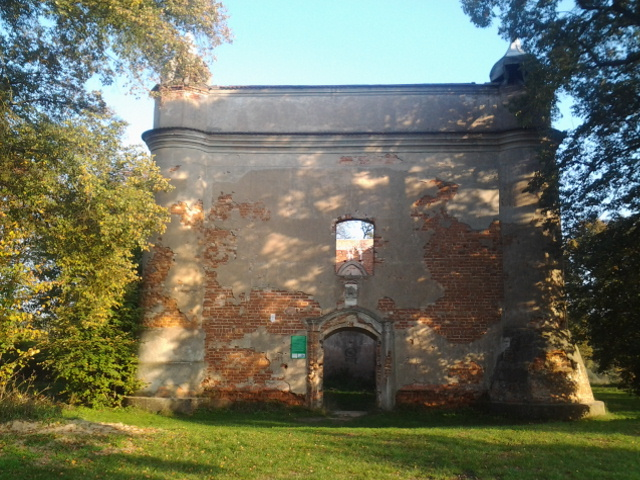

- Location within Poland
- Coordinates: 52°31′39″N 16°54′34″E
- Country: Poland
- Voivodeship: Greater Poland
- County: Poznań
- Gmina: Suchy Las

Population
  - Total: 0

Chojnica [xɔi̯ˈnit͡sa] is a former village in the administrative district of Gmina Suchy Las, within Poznań County, Greater Poland Voivodeship, in west-central Poland.

The site of the village is now within the area of the military training ground centred on Biedrusko.
