= Biedrusko =

- Village
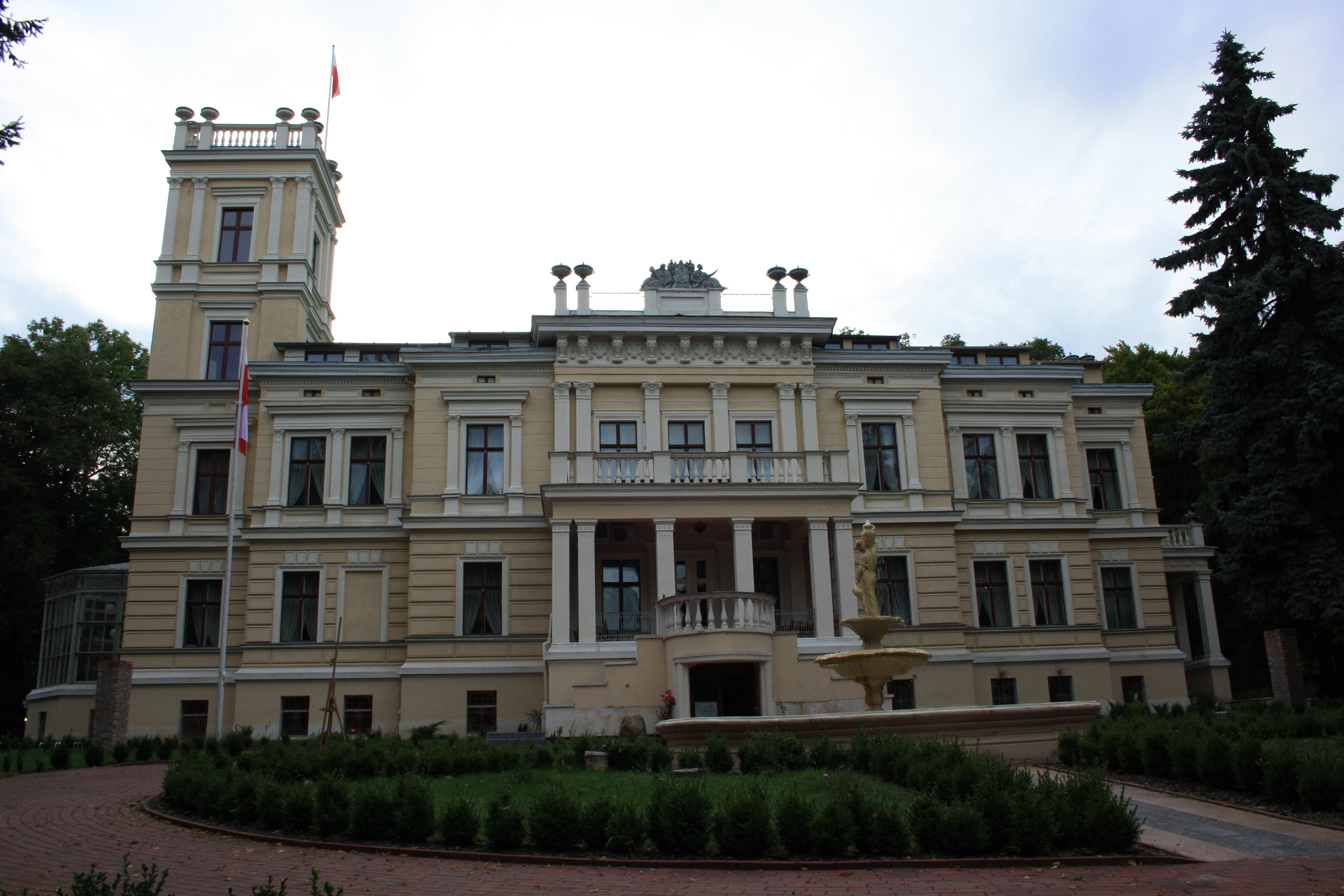
- Palace

- Location within Poland
- Coordinates: 52°32′N 16°56′E
- Country: Poland
- Voivodeship: Greater Poland
- County: Poznań
- Gmina: Suchy Las
- Population: ~2,200
- Time zone: UTC+1 (CET)
  - Summer (DST): UTC+2 (CEST)
- Website: http://www.biedrusko.org

Biedrusko [bjɛˈdruskɔ] is a village in the administrative district of Gmina Suchy Las, within Poznań County, Greater Poland Voivodeship, in west-central Poland. In 2006 the village had a population of ~2,200.

Biedrusko is the centre of a large military training area of the Polish Army. It contains an army barracks, a palace (undergoing restoration), and a large modern estate of apartment blocks.

== History ==
Biedrusko was first recorded in the 13th century. The village belonged to the Cistercian order (according to various sources from 1242, 1491 or 1518), and administratively it was part of the Poznań Voivodeship of the Greater Poland Province of the Polish Crown until the Second Partition of Poland in 1793 when it was annexed by Prussia. The village was then subjected to Germanisation, and Prussians confiscated church goods and handed them over to German landowners in 1797. From 1807 it was part of the short-lived Polish Duchy of Warsaw, in 1815 it was re-annexed by Prussia, and from 1871 it was also part of Germany.

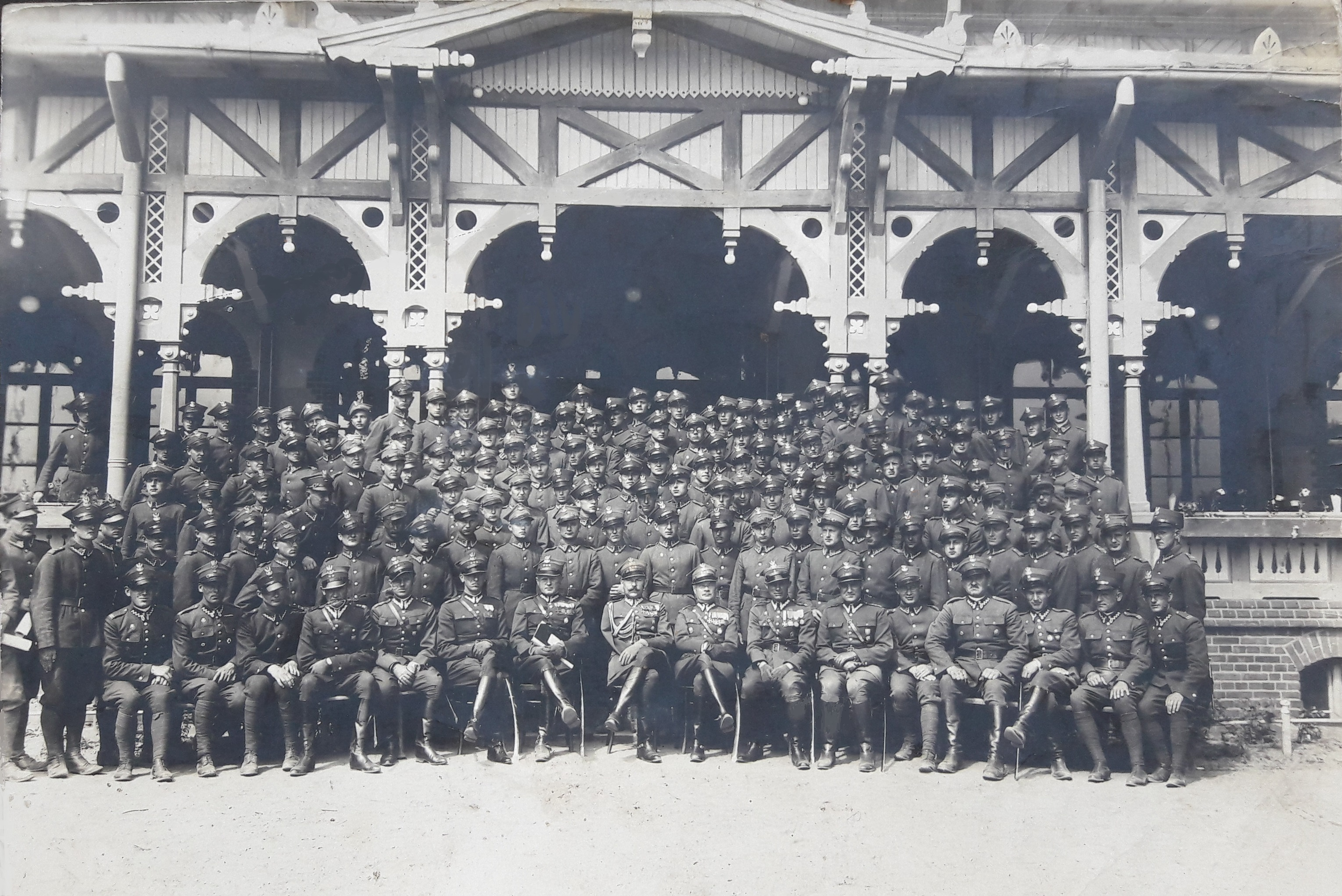
25th Infantry Division of the Polish Army in Biedrusko in 1937

In 1904 the German Army bought the area, and then set up a large military training area. In November 1918, after World War I, Poland regained independence, and on December 28, 1918, Biedrusko was captured by Polish insurgents, whose aim was to reintegrate the Greater Poland region with Poland. The village was successfully restored to Poland, and the garrison was taken over by the Polish Army. It has been in use by the Polish military since then, except during the German occupation of Poland (World War II) when the German Army used it again as the Warthelager training camp. This area includes the site of several now uninhabited former villages, including Chojnica, Glinienko, Glinno, Knyszyna, Łagiewniki, Okalewo, Trzuskotowo and Tworkowo. Polish crafts, services and agriculture developed in the interbellum, and in 1937, the garrison was expanded.
