= Gmina Suchy Las =

Gmina Suchy Las Suchy Las Commune
- Gmina
- Flag Coat of arms
- Interactive map of Gmina Suchy Las
- Coordinates (Suchy Las): 52°28′31″N 16°52′57″E
- Country: Poland
- Voivodeship: Greater Poland
- County: Poznań County
- Seat: Suchy Las

Area
  - Total: 116.55 km^{2} (45.00 sq mi)

Population (2006)
  - Total: 13,219
  - Density: 113.42/km^{2} (293.75/sq mi)
- Website: http://www.suchylas.pl/

Gmina Suchy Las is a rural gmina (administrative district) in Poznań County, Greater Poland Voivodeship, in west-central Poland. Its seat is the village of Suchy Las, which lies to the immediate north of the city of Poznań.

The gmina covers an area of 116.55 square kilometres (45.0 sq mi), and as of 2096 its total population is 13,219.

== Villages ==
Gmina Suchy Las contains the villages and settlements of Biedrusko, Chludowo, Golęczewo, Suchy Las, Zielątkowo, Złotkowo and Złotniki. It also contains the former villages of Chojnica, Glinienko, Glinno, Knyszyna, Łagiewniki, Okalewo, Trzuskotowo and Tworkowo, now uninhabited, which lie within the area of the military training area centred on Biedrusko.

== Neighbouring gminas ==
Gmina Suchy Las is bordered by the city of Poznań and by the gminas of Czerwonak, Murowana Goślina, Oborniki and Rokietnica.
