= Golęczewo =

- Village
- Location within Poland
- Coordinates: 52°30′07″N 16°49′05″E
- Country: Poland
- Voivodeship: Greater Poland
- County: Poznań
- Gmina: Suchy Las
- Population: 600

Golęczewo [ɡɔlɛnˈt͡ʂɛvɔ] is a village in the administrative district of Gmina Suchy Las, within Poznań County, Greater Poland Voivodeship, in west-central Poland.
