= Michel Moran =

Spanish-french cook and restaurateur

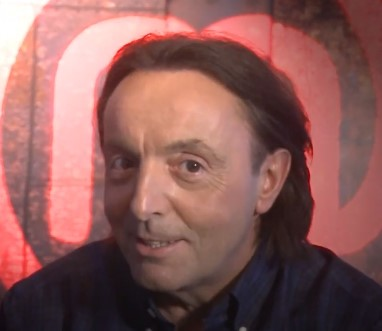
- Moran in 2020
- Born: June 5, 1965 (age 60); Paris, France
- Education: Jean Drouant
- Occupations: Cook, restaurateur
- Spouse: Halina Moran
- Children: Solene Moran, Andrea Moran

Michel Moran (Paris, June 5, 1965) is a French restaurateur and master chef of Spanish origin. Juror of the Polish edition of MasterChef and MasterChef Junior broadcast on TVN. He lives in Poland permanently.

He is Andalusian by origin (son of Spanish emigrants). He studied at the hotel industry school Jean Drouant. He completed his apprenticeship, among others at the 5-star Royal Monceau Hotel. Since 2004, he has been the owner and chef of the Bistro de Paris restaurant, located in the building of the Warsaw National Opera, which received recommendations from Michelin in 2012. In 2013, he published his cookbook, widely reviewed on internet portals. In 2006, he was awarded the French Order of Agricultural Merit, awarded by the Minister of Agriculture, Dominique Bussereau, for promoting national agricultural products and fish and seafood.

== Publications ==
- Moje smaki, Wydawnictwo MUZA S.A., 2013, ISBN 978-83-7758-479-8
