= Zielątkowo, Greater Poland Voivodeship =

Zielątkowo
- Village
- Location within Poland
- Coordinates: 52°33′39″N 16°47′52″E
- Country: Poland
- Voivodeship: Greater Poland
- County: Poznań
- Gmina: Suchy Las

Zielątkowo [ʑɛlɔntˈkɔvɔ] is a village in the administrative district of Gmina Suchy Las, within Poznań County, Greater Poland Voivodeship, in west-central Poland.
