= Suchy Las =

- Village
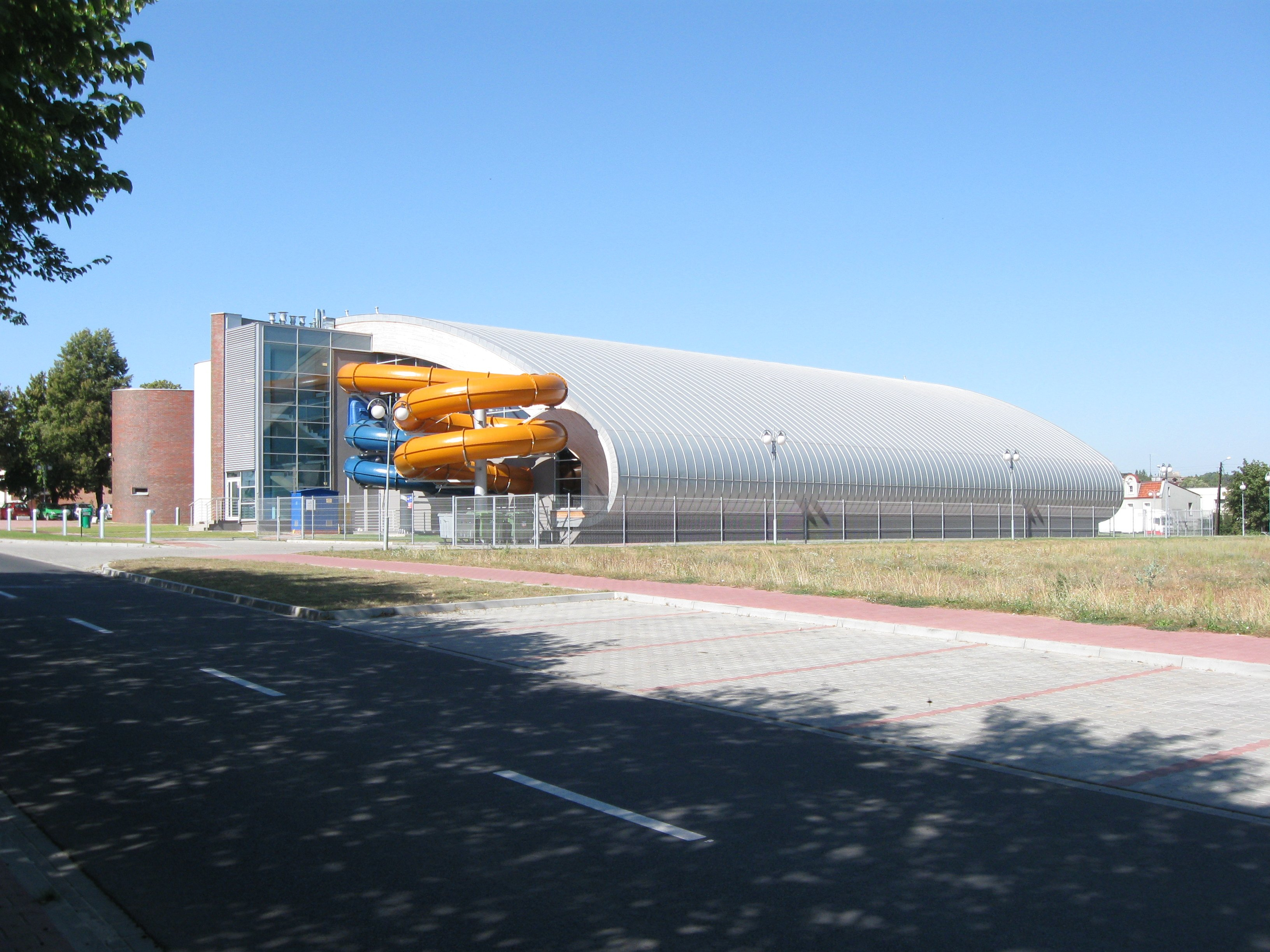
- Swimming pool in Suchy Las

- Coat of arms

- Location within Poland
- Coordinates: 52°28′31″N 16°52′57″E
- Country: Poland
- Voivodeship: Greater Poland
- County: Poznań
- Gmina: Suchy Las

Population
  - Total: 4,367
- Time zone: UTC+1 (CET)
  - Summer (DST): UTC+2 (CEST)
- Vehicle registration: PZ, POZ
- Website: http://www.suchylas.pl

Suchy Las ([ˈsuxɨ ˈlas], "dry forest") is a village in Poznań County, Greater Poland Voivodeship, in west-central Poland. It is the seat of the gmina (administrative district) called Gmina Suchy Las.
