= Smokowo =

Smokowo may refer to the following villages in Poland:

- Smokowo, Pomeranian Voivodeship
- Smokowo, Warmian-Masurian Voivodeship
