= Gołubie Kaszubskie railway station =

Railway station in Gołubie, Poland

Gołubie Kaszubskie
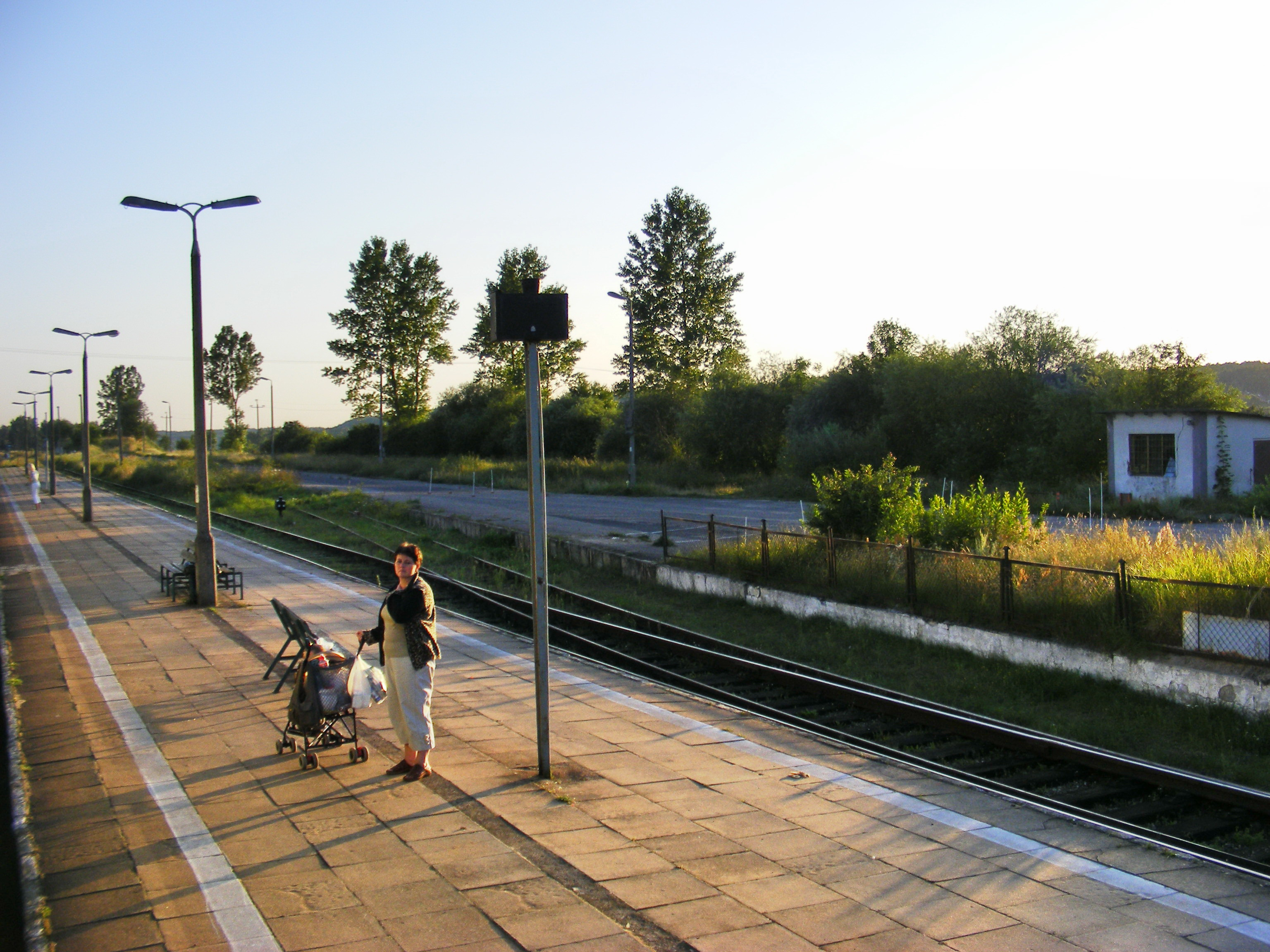
- Gołubie Kaszubskie railway station in 2007

General information
- Location: Gołubie Kaszubskie, Pomeranian Voivodeship; Poland
- System: Railway Station
- Operator: SKM Tricity
- Lines: 201: Nowa Wieś Wielka–Gdynia Port railway Kościerzyna–Gołubie Kaszubskie railway (closed)
- Platforms: 2
- Tracks: 2

History
- Rebuilt: 2014
Location
- Location within Poland

Gołubie Kaszubskie railway station is a railway station serving the town of Gołubie, in the Pomeranian Voivodeship, Poland. The station is located on the Nowa Wieś Wielka–Gdynia Port railway. The train services are operated by SKM Tricity.

The station also used to lie on the Kościerzyna–Gołubie Kaszubskie railway until its closure in 1930. This line has been dismantled. The station used to be known as Golben under German occupation.

== Modernisation ==
In 2014 the station was modernised. The modernization included replacing the switches and the surface of the main and passing tracks, and constructing a new platform. An integration hub was opened in October 2017.

== Train services ==
The station is served by the following services:

- Pomorska Kolej Metropolitalna services (R) Kościerzyna — Gdańsk Port Lotniczy (Airport) — Gdańsk Wrzeszcz — Gdynia Główna
- Pomorska Kolej Metropolitalna services (R) Kościerzyna — Gdańsk Osowa — Gdynia Główna

Preceding station	Polregio	Following station
Skorzewo towards Kościerzyna	PR (Via Gdańsk Osowa)	Krzeszna towards Gdynia Główna
Skorzewo towards Kościerzyna	PR (Via Gdańsk Port Lotniczy (Airport) and Gdańsk Wrzeszcz)	Krzeszna towards Gdynia Główna
