= Wieżyca railway station =

Railway station in Kartuzy County, Poland

Wieżyca
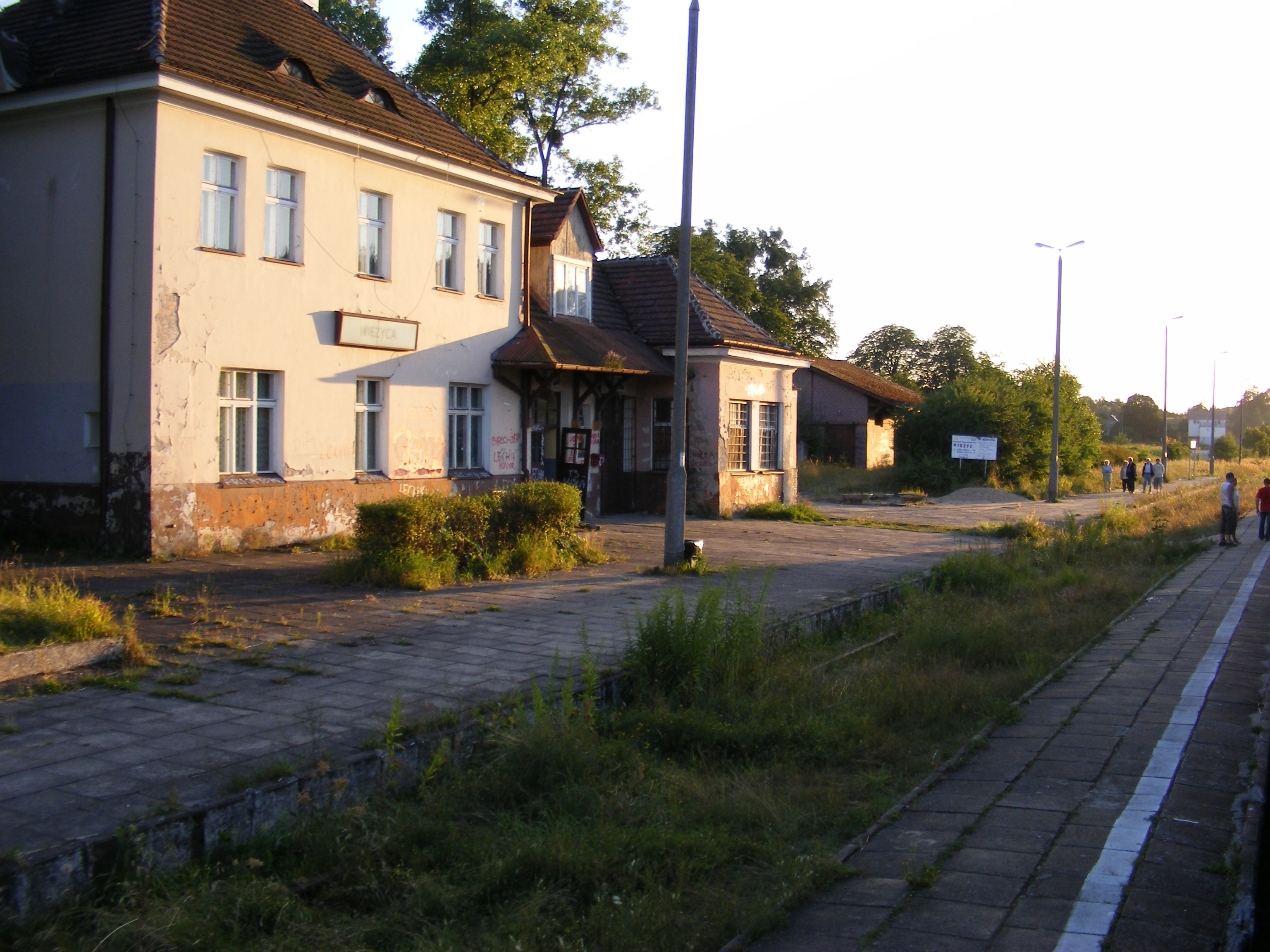
- Wieżyca railway station in 2007

General information
- Location: Wieżyca, Pomeranian Voivodeship; Poland
- System: Railway Station
- Operator: SKM Tricity
- Line: 201: Nowa Wieś Wielka–Gdynia Port railway
- Platforms: 1
- Tracks: 1

History
- Rebuilt: 2014
Location
- Location within Poland

Wieżyca railway station is a railway station serving the town of Wieżyca, in the Pomeranian Voivodeship, Poland. The station is located on the Nowa Wieś Wielka–Gdynia Port railway. The train services are operated by SKM Tricity.

The station used to be known as Thurmberg under German occupation.

== Modernisation ==
In 2014 the platform was modernised.

== Train services ==
The station is served by the following services:

- Pomorska Kolej Metropolitalna services (R) Kościerzyna — Gdańsk Port Lotniczy (Airport) — Gdańsk Wrzeszcz — Gdynia Główna
- Pomorska Kolej Metropolitalna services (R) Kościerzyna — Gdańsk Osowa — Gdynia Główna

Preceding station	Polregio	Following station
Krzeszna towards Kościerzyna	PR (Via Gdańsk Osowa)	Sławki towards Gdynia Główna
Krzeszna towards Kościerzyna	PR (Via Gdańsk Port Lotniczy (Airport) and Gdańsk Wrzeszcz)	Sławki towards Gdynia Główna
