= Krzeszna railway station =

Railway station in Krzeszna, Poland

Krzeszna
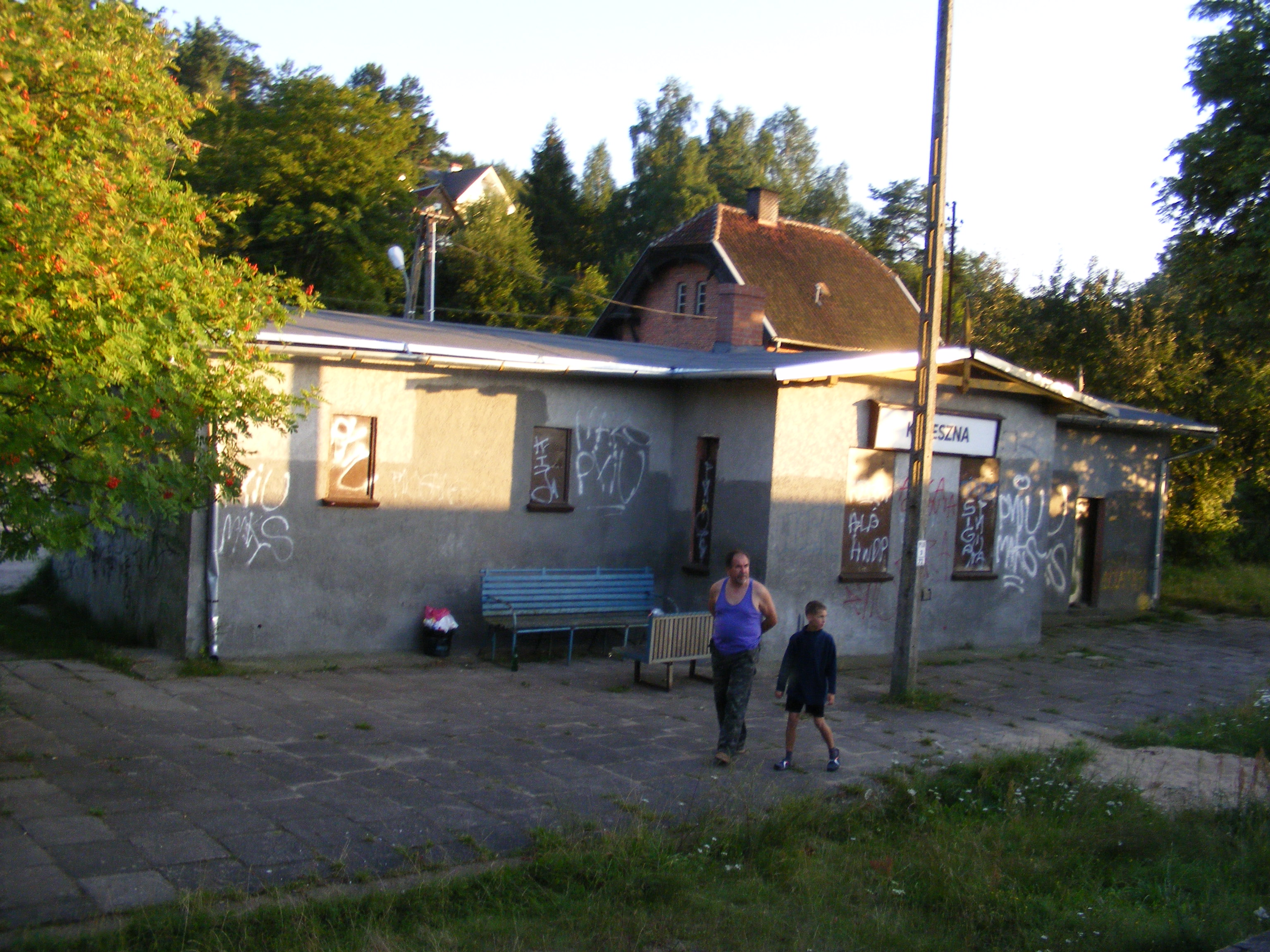
- Krzeszna railway station in 2007

General information
- Location: Krzeszna, Pomeranian Voivodeship; Poland
- System: Railway Station
- Operator: SKM Tricity
- Line: 201: Nowa Wieś Wielka–Gdynia Port railway
- Platforms: 1
- Tracks: 1

History
- Rebuilt: 2014
Location
- Location within Poland

Krzeszna railway station is a railway station serving the town of Krzeszna, in the Pomeranian Voivodeship, Poland. The station is located on the Nowa Wieś Wielka–Gdynia Port railway. The train services are operated by SKM Tricity.

The station used to be known as Groß Kresin under German occupation.

== Modernisation ==
In 2014 the platform was modernised.

== Train services ==
The station is served by the following services:

- Pomorska Kolej Metropolitalna services (R) Kościerzyna — Gdańsk Port Lotniczy (Airport) — Gdańsk Wrzeszcz — Gdynia Główna
- Pomorska Kolej Metropolitalna services (R) Kościerzyna — Gdańsk Osowa — Gdynia Główna

Preceding station	Polregio	Following station
Gołubie Kaszubskie towards Kościerzyna	PR (Via Gdańsk Osowa)	Wieżyca towards Gdynia Główna
Gołubie Kaszubskie towards Kościerzyna	PR (Via Gdańsk Port Lotniczy (Airport) and Gdańsk Wrzeszcz)	Wieżyca towards Gdynia Główna
