= Nowy Ostrów =

Nowy Ostrów may refer to the following places:

- Nowy Ostrów, Podlaskie Voivodeship (north-east Poland)
- Nowy Ostrów, Kartuzy County in Pomeranian Voivodeship (north Poland)
- Nowy Ostrów, Warmian-Masurian Voivodeship (north Poland)
