= Piekło =

Piekło may refer to the following places:

- Piekło, Lesser Poland Voivodeship (south Poland)
- Piekło, Opole Voivodeship (south-west Poland)
- Piekło, Świętokrzyskie Voivodeship (south-central Poland)
- Piekło, Kartuzy County in Pomeranian Voivodeship (north Poland)
- Piekło, Kościerzyna County in Pomeranian Voivodeship (north Poland)
- Piekło, Sztum County in Pomeranian Voivodeship (north Poland)
- Piekło, Warmian-Masurian Voivodeship (north Poland)
