= Kolano =

Kolano (meaning "knee" in Polish) may refer to the following villages:

- Kolano, Lublin Voivodeship (east Poland)
- Kolano, Pomeranian Voivodeship (north Poland)
