= Mestwin =

Mestwin may refer to:

- Mestwin I, Duke of Pomerania (1160–1217/1220), Duke of Eastern Pomerania in 1207–1220
- Mestwin II, Duke of Pomerania (1220–1294), Duke of Pomerelia in 1266–1294
- Mestwin, Poland, a village in Pomerania
