= Stężycka Huta =

- Village
- Location within Poland
- Coordinates: 54°13′29″N 17°54′12″E
- Country: Poland
- Voivodeship: Pomeranian
- County: Kartuzy
- Gmina: Stężyca
- Population: 163

Stężycka Huta [stɛ̃ˈʐɨt͡ska ˈxuta] is a village in the administrative district of Gmina Stężyca, within Kartuzy County, Pomeranian Voivodeship, in northern Poland.

For details of the history of the region, see History of Pomerania.
