= Sławki railway station =

Railway station in Sławki, Poland

Sławki
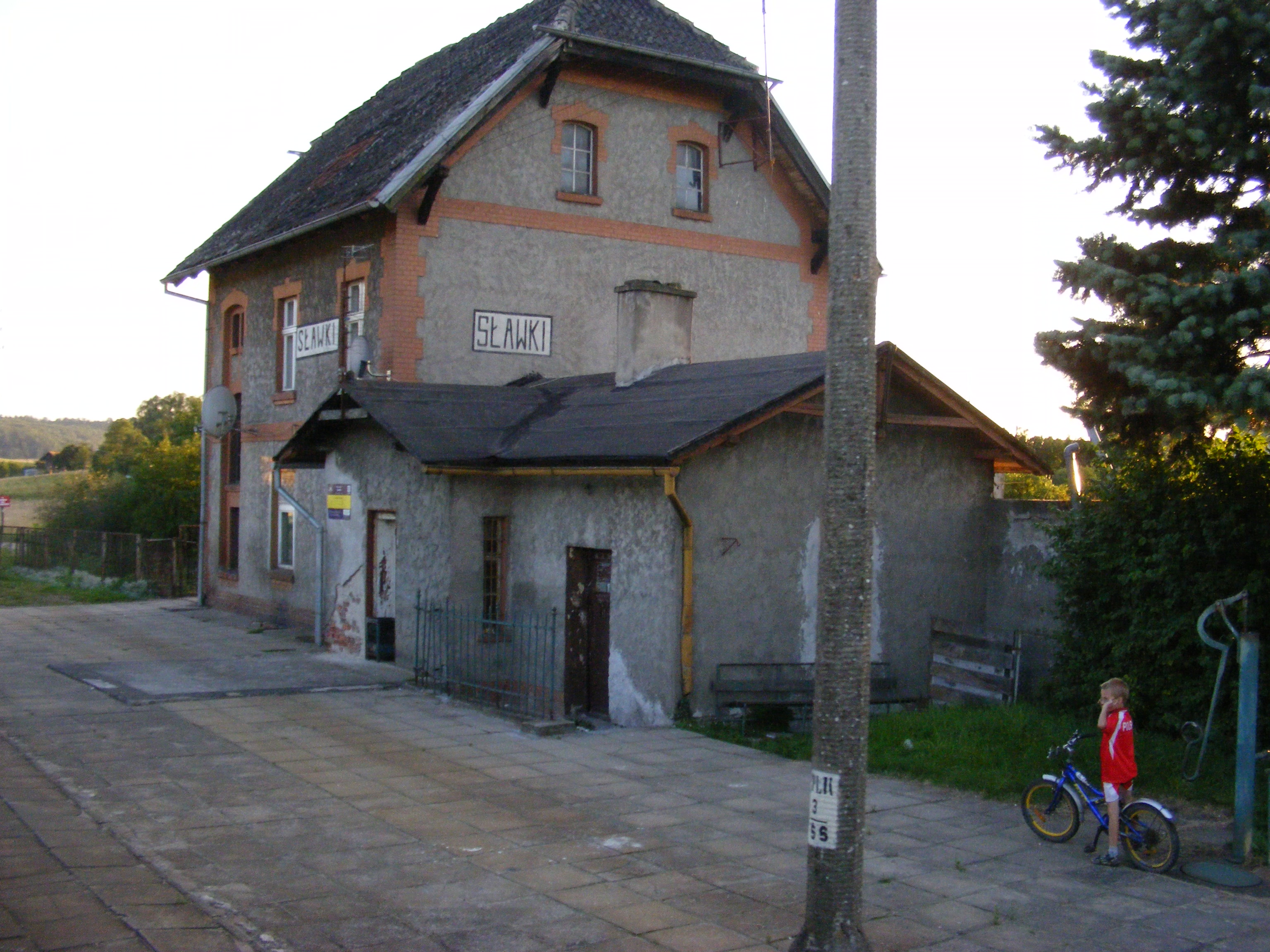
- Sławki railway station in 2007

General information
- Location: Sławki, Pomeranian Voivodeship; Poland
- System: Railway Station
- Operator: SKM Tricity
- Line: 201: Nowa Wieś Wielka–Gdynia Port railway
- Platforms: 1
- Tracks: 1

History
- Rebuilt: 2014
Location
- Location within Poland

Sławki railway station is a railway station serving the village of Sławki, in the Pomeranian Voivodeship, Poland. The station is located on the Nowa Wieś Wielka–Gdynia Port railway. The train services are operated by SKM Tricity.

During the German occupation, the station was called Schlaffenberg

== Modernisation ==
In 2014 the platform was modernised.

== Train services ==
The station is served by the following services:

- Pomorska Kolej Metropolitalna services (R) Kościerzyna — Gdańsk Port Lotniczy (Airport) — Gdańsk Wrzeszcz — Gdynia Główna
- Pomorska Kolej Metropolitalna services (R) Kościerzyna — Gdańsk Osowa — Gdynia Główna

Preceding station	Polregio	Following station
Wieżyca towards Kościerzyna	PR (Via Gdańsk Osowa)	Somonino towards Gdynia Główna
Wieżyca towards Kościerzyna	PR (Via Gdańsk Port Lotniczy (Airport) and Gdańsk Wrzeszcz)	Somonino towards Gdynia Główna
