= Kamienica Szlachecka =

- Village
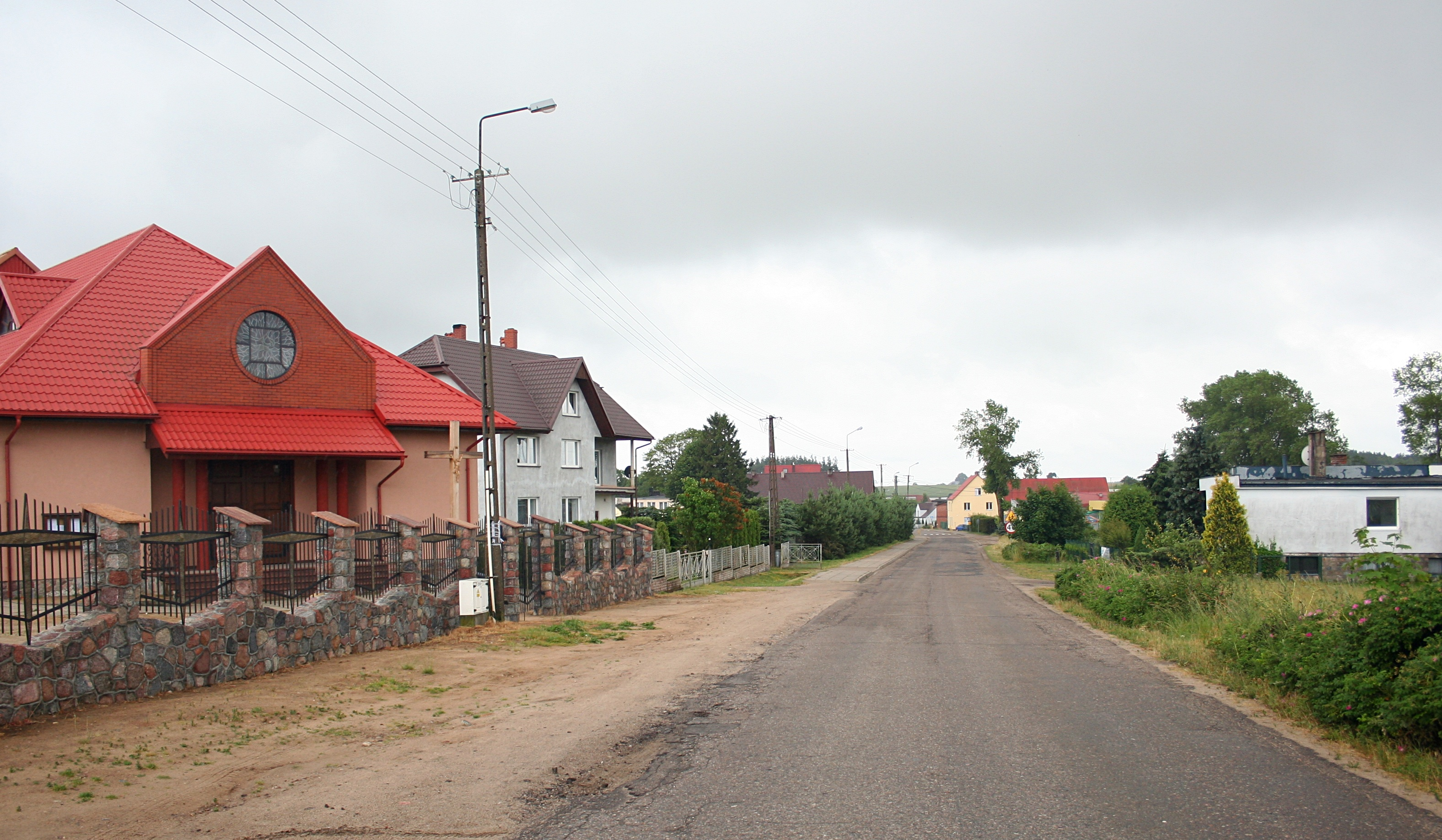

- Location within Poland
- Coordinates: 54°16′8″N 17°56′53″E
- Country: Poland
- Voivodeship: Pomeranian
- County: Kartuzy
- Gmina: Stężyca
- Population: 755

Kamienica Szlachecka [kamjɛˈnit͡sa ʂlaˈxɛt͡ska] is a village in the administrative district of Gmina Stężyca, within Kartuzy County, Pomeranian Voivodeship, in northern Poland.

For details of the history of the region, see History of Pomerania.
