= Klukowa Huta =

- Village
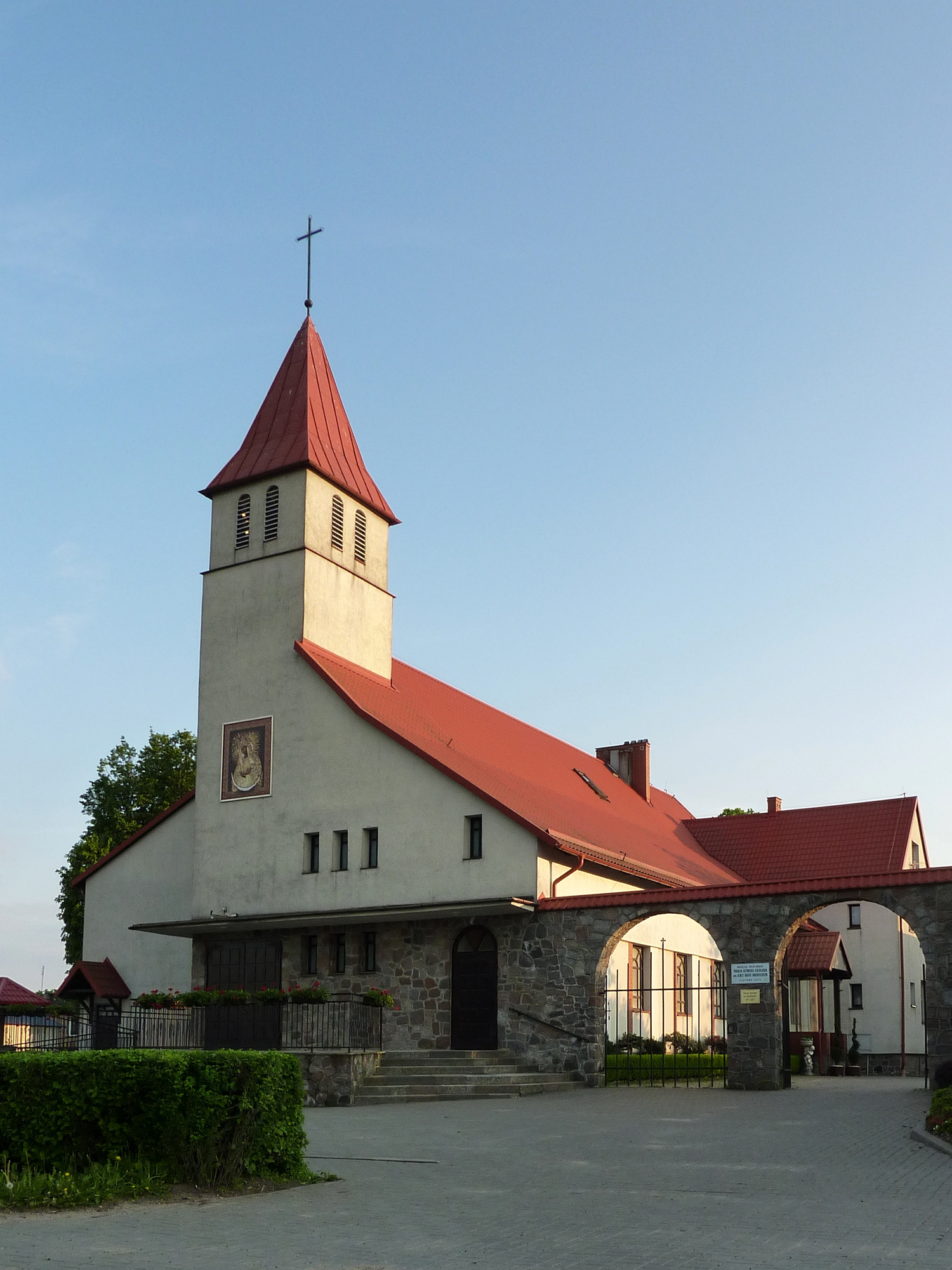

- Location within Poland
- Coordinates: 54°14′28″N 17°53′53″E
- Country: Poland
- Voivodeship: Pomeranian
- County: Kartuzy
- Gmina: Stężyca
- Population: 561

Klukowa Huta [kluˈkɔva ˈxuta] is a village in the administrative district of Gmina Stężyca, within Kartuzy County, Pomeranian Voivodeship, in northern Poland.

For details of the history of the region, see History of Pomerania.
