= Kucborowo =

- Settlement
- Location within Poland
- Coordinates: 54°11′9″N 17°56′29″E
- Country: Poland
- Voivodeship: Pomeranian
- County: Kartuzy
- Gmina: Stężyca
- Population: 5

Kucborowo [kut͡sbɔˈrɔvɔ] is a settlement in the administrative district of Gmina Stężyca, within Kartuzy County, Pomeranian Voivodeship, in northern Poland.

For details of the history of the region, see History of Pomerania.
