= Gołubie-Wybudowanie =

Village in Poland

- Village
- Location within Poland
- Coordinates: 54°13′21″N 18°1′28″E
- Country: Poland
- Voivodeship: Pomeranian
- County: Kartuzy
- Gmina: Stężyca
- Population: 154

Gołubie-Wybudowanie [ɡɔˈwubjɛ vɨbudɔˈvaɲɛ] is a village in the administrative district of Gmina Stężyca, within Kartuzy County, Pomeranian Voivodeship, in northern Poland.
