= Rzepiska, Pomeranian Voivodeship =

Rzepiska
- Village
- Location within Poland
- Coordinates: 54°11′58″N 17°52′36″E
- Country: Poland
- Voivodeship: Pomeranian
- County: Kartuzy
- Gmina: Stężyca
- Population: 50

Rzepiska [ʐɛˈpiska] is a village in the administrative district of Gmina Stężyca, within Kartuzy County, Pomeranian Voivodeship, in northern Poland.

For details of the history of the region, see History of Pomerania.
