= Drozdowo, Kartuzy County =

Drozdowo
- Settlement
- Location within Poland
- Coordinates: 54°12′36″N 18°8′25″E
- Country: Poland
- Voivodeship: Pomeranian
- County: Kartuzy
- Gmina: Stężyca
- Population: 26

Drozdowo [drɔzˈdɔvɔ] is a settlement in the administrative district of Gmina Stężyca, within Kartuzy County, Pomeranian Voivodeship, in northern Poland.

For details of the history of the region, see History of Pomerania.
