= Szymbark, Pomeranian Voivodeship =

Szymbark Szimbark (Kashubian)
- Village
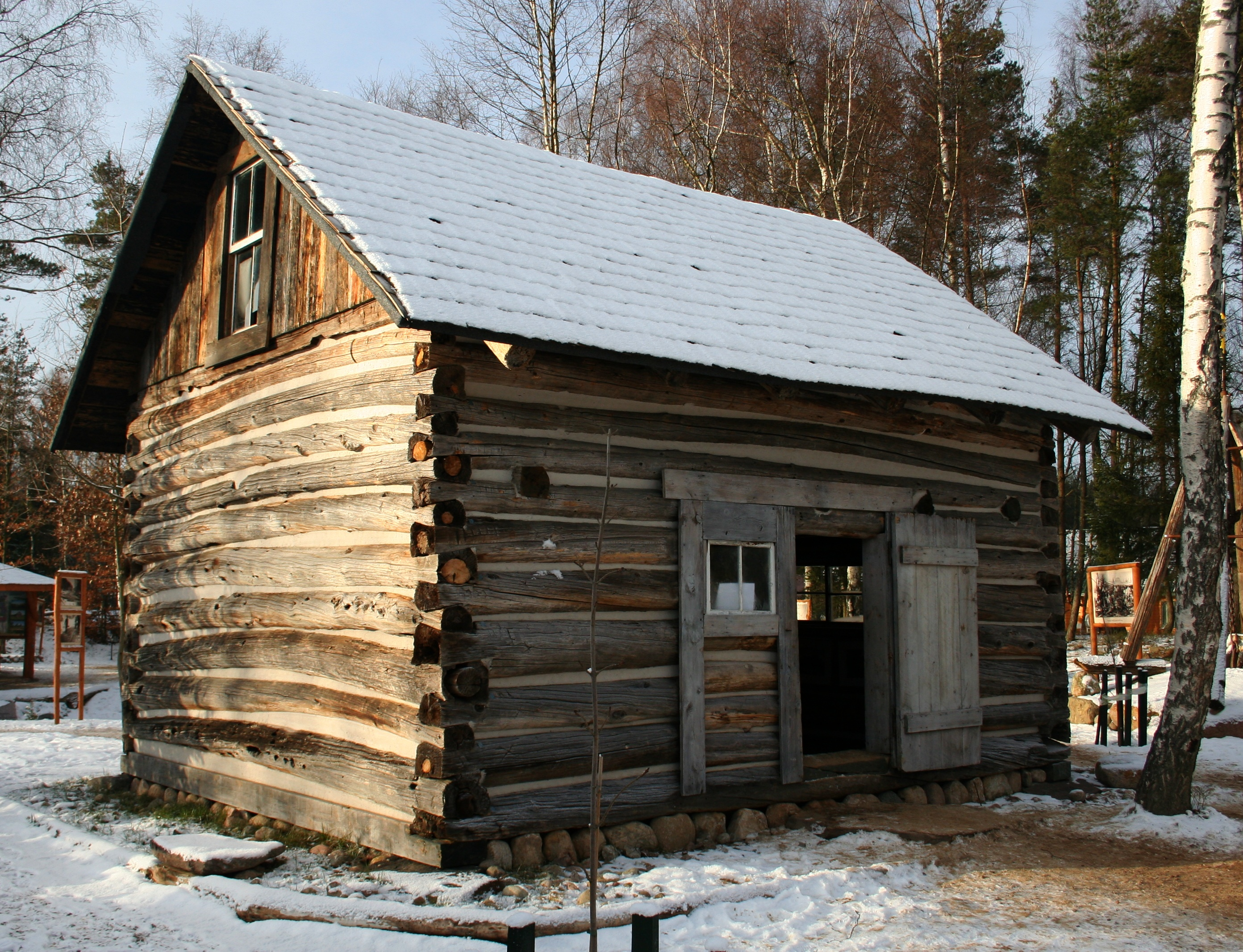
- A traditional wooden Kashubian home.

- Location within Poland
- Coordinates: 54°13′8″N 18°6′8″E
- Country: Poland
- Voivodeship: Pomeranian
- County: Kartuzy
- Gmina: Stężyca
- Population: 541

Szymbark (Polish: [ˈʂɨmbark]) is a village in the administrative district of Gmina Stężyca, within Kartuzy County, Pomeranian Voivodeship, in northern Poland.

The town features several tourist attractions, including an open-air museum featuring traditional Kashubian wooden houses, an upside-down house, and the longest wooden plank in the world (measuring 38.83 meters). The upside-down house, commissioned by Daniel Czapiewski, was completed in 2007 and was intended as a visual metaphor for Poland's communist era.

== See also ==
- History of Pomerania.

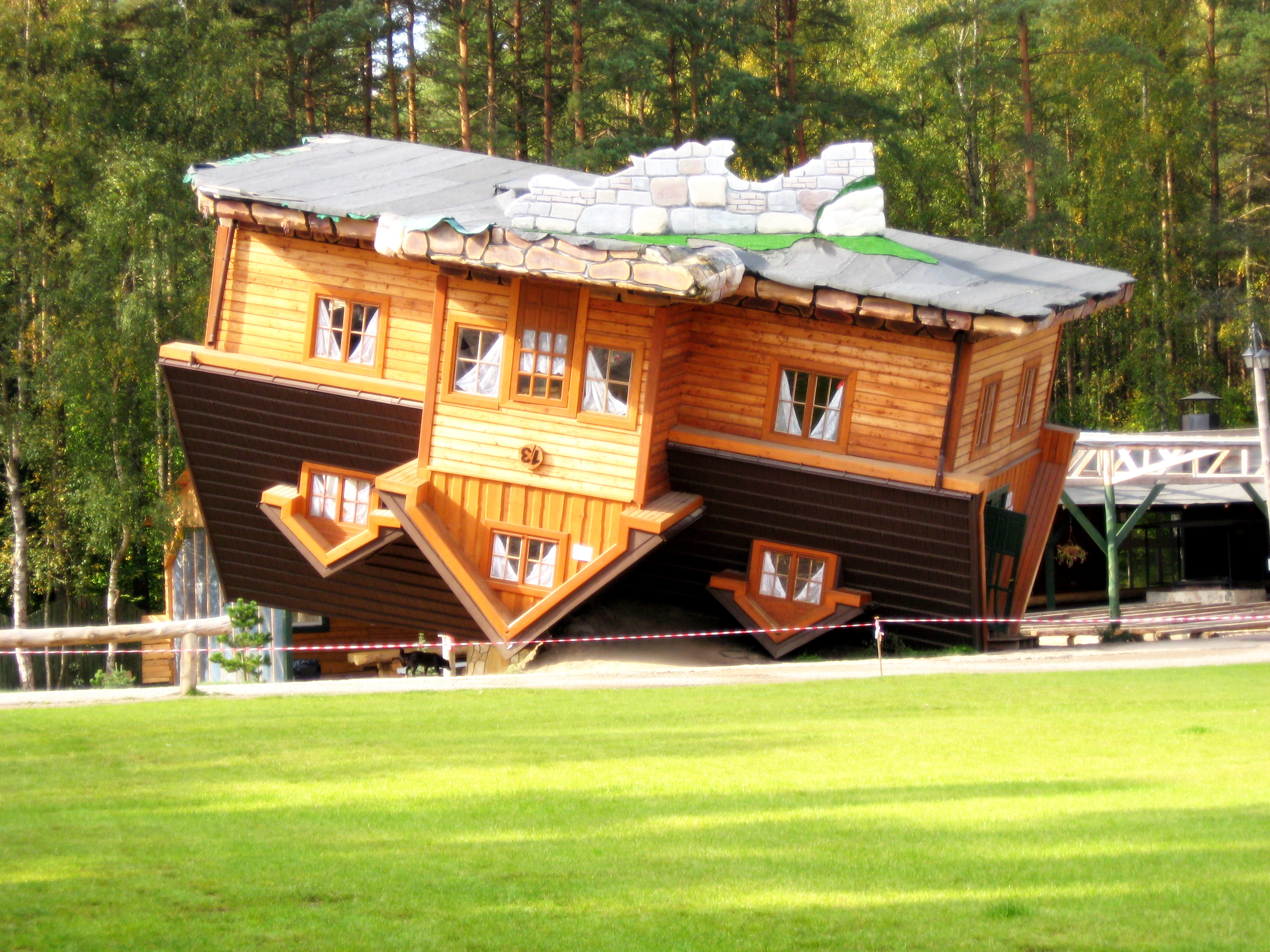
Open-air museum in Szymbark
