= Potuły, Pomeranian Voivodeship =

Potuły
- Village
- Location within Poland
- Coordinates: 54°13′17″N 18°5′10″E
- Country: Poland
- Voivodeship: Pomeranian
- County: Kartuzy
- Gmina: Stężyca
- Population: 320

Potuły [pɔˈtuwɨ] is a village in the administrative district of Gmina Stężyca, within Kartuzy County, Pomeranian Voivodeship, in northern Poland.

For details of the history of the region, see History of Pomerania.
