= Kamienny Dół =

- Settlement
- Location within Poland
- Coordinates: 54°15′26″N 17°59′23″E
- Country: Poland
- Voivodeship: Pomeranian
- County: Kartuzy
- Gmina: Stężyca
- Population: 19

Kamienny Dół (Polish pronunciation: [kaˈmjɛnːɨ ˈduw]) is a settlement in the administrative district of Gmina Stężyca, within Kartuzy County, Pomeranian Voivodeship, in northern Poland.

For details of the history of the region, see History of Pomerania.
