= Gmina Stężyca, Pomeranian Voivodeship =

Gmina Stężyca Stężyca Commune
- Gmina
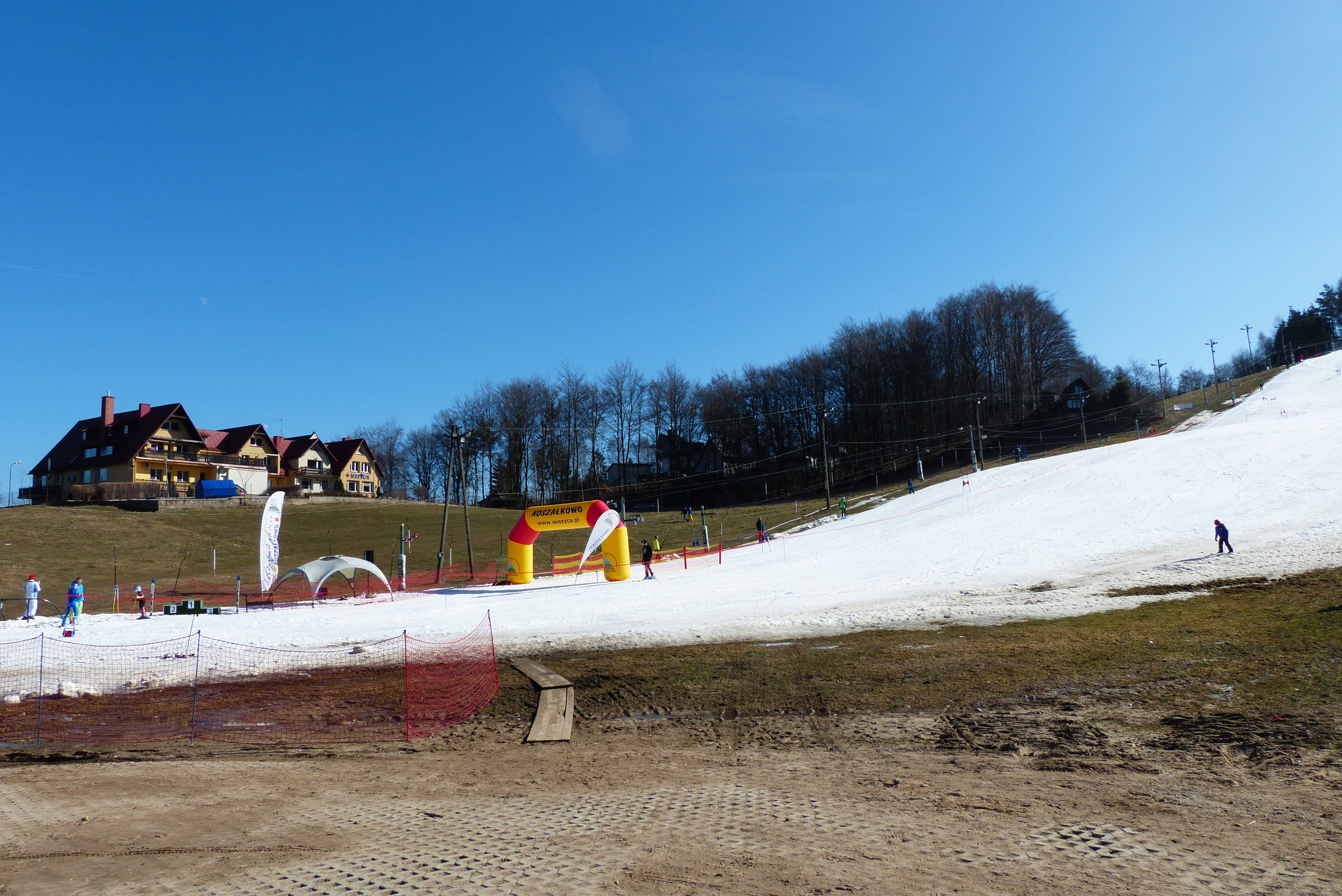
- Koszalkowo Ski Slope

- Coat of arms
- Interactive map of Gmina Stężyca
- Coordinates (Stężyca): 54°12′19″N 17°56′57″E
- Country: Poland
- Voivodeship: Pomeranian
- County: Kartuzy
- Seat: Stężyca

Area
  - Total: 160.3 km^{2} (61.9 sq mi)

Population (2006)
  - Total: 8,695
  - Density: 54.24/km^{2} (140.5/sq mi)
- Website: https://www.gminastezyca.pl

Gmina Stężyca (Kashubian: Stãżëca) is a rural gmina (administrative district) in Kartuzy County, Pomeranian Voivodeship, in northern Poland. Its seat is the village of Stężyca, which lies approximately 22 kilometres (14 mi) south-west of Kartuzy and 48 km (30 mi) west of the regional capital Gdańsk.

The gmina covers an area of 160.3 square kilometres (61.9 sq mi), and as of 2006 its total population is 8,695.

== Villages ==
Gmina Stężyca contains the villages and settlements of Betlejem, Bolwerk, Borucino, Chróstowo, Czapielski Młyn, Czysta Woda, Dąbniak, Dąbrowa, Danachowo, Delowo, Drozdowo, Dubowo, Gapowo, Gołubie, Gołubie-Wybudowanie, Kamienica Szlachecka, Kamienny Dół, Klukowa Huta, Kolano, Krzeszna, Krzeszna-Stacja, Kucborowo, Kukówka, Łączyno, Łączyński Młyn, Mała Krzeszna, Malbork, Mestwin, Niebo, Niesiołowice, Nowa Sikorska Huta, Nowa Wieś, Nowe Czaple, Nowe Łosienice, Nowy Ostrów, Ostrowo, Pażęce, Piekło, Pierszczewko, Pierszczewo, Potuły, Przyrowie, Pustka, Pypkowo, Rzepiska, Sikorzyno, Smokowo, Stara Sikorska Huta, Stare Czaple, Stare Łosienice, Stężyca, Stężyca-Wybudowanie, Stężycka Huta, Szczukowo, Szymbark, Teklowo, Uniradze, Wieżyca, Wygoda Łączyńska, Zdrębowo, Zgorzałe and Żuromino.

== Neighbouring gminas ==
Gmina Stężyca is bordered by the gminas of Chmielno, Kartuzy, Kościerzyna, Sierakowice, Somonino and Sulęczyno.
