= Sławki =

- Village
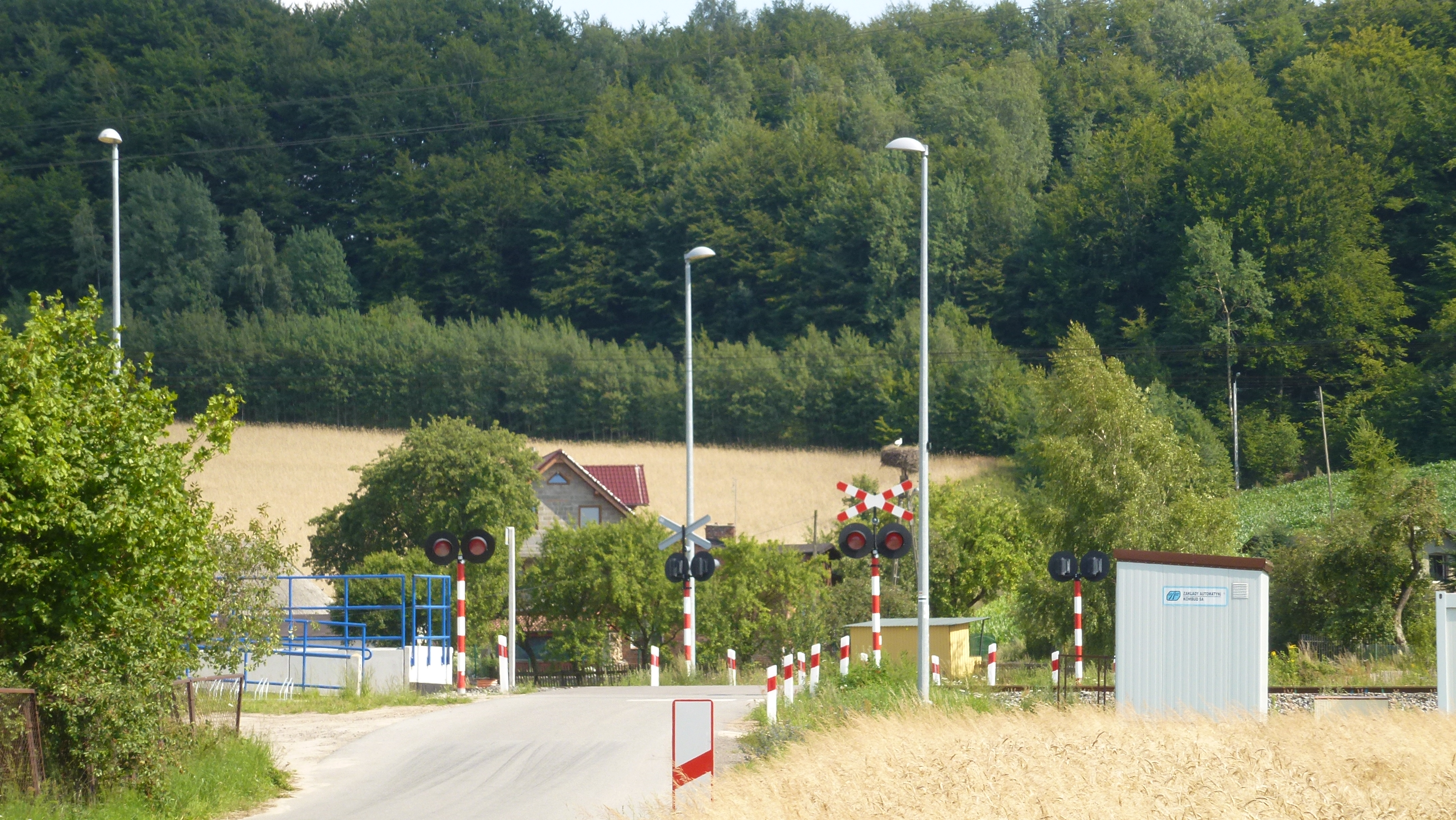

- Location within Poland
- Coordinates: 54°15′23″N 18°10′36″E
- Country: Poland
- Voivodeship: Pomeranian
- County: Kartuzy
- Gmina: Somonino
- Population: 412
- Time zone: UTC+1 (CET)
  - Summer (DST): UTC+2 (CEST)
- Vehicle registration: GKA

Sławki [ˈswafki] is a village in the administrative district of Gmina Somonino, within Kartuzy County, Pomeranian Voivodeship, in northern Poland. It is located in the ethnocultural region of Kashubia in the historic region of Pomerania.

== History ==
During the German occupation of Poland (World War II), in 1939, some Poles from Sławki were among the victims of a massacre committed by the Germans in nearby Kaliska as part of the genocidal Intelligenzaktion campaign.

== Transport ==
There is a railway station in the village.
