= Stężyca, Pomeranian Voivodeship =

Stężyca
- Village
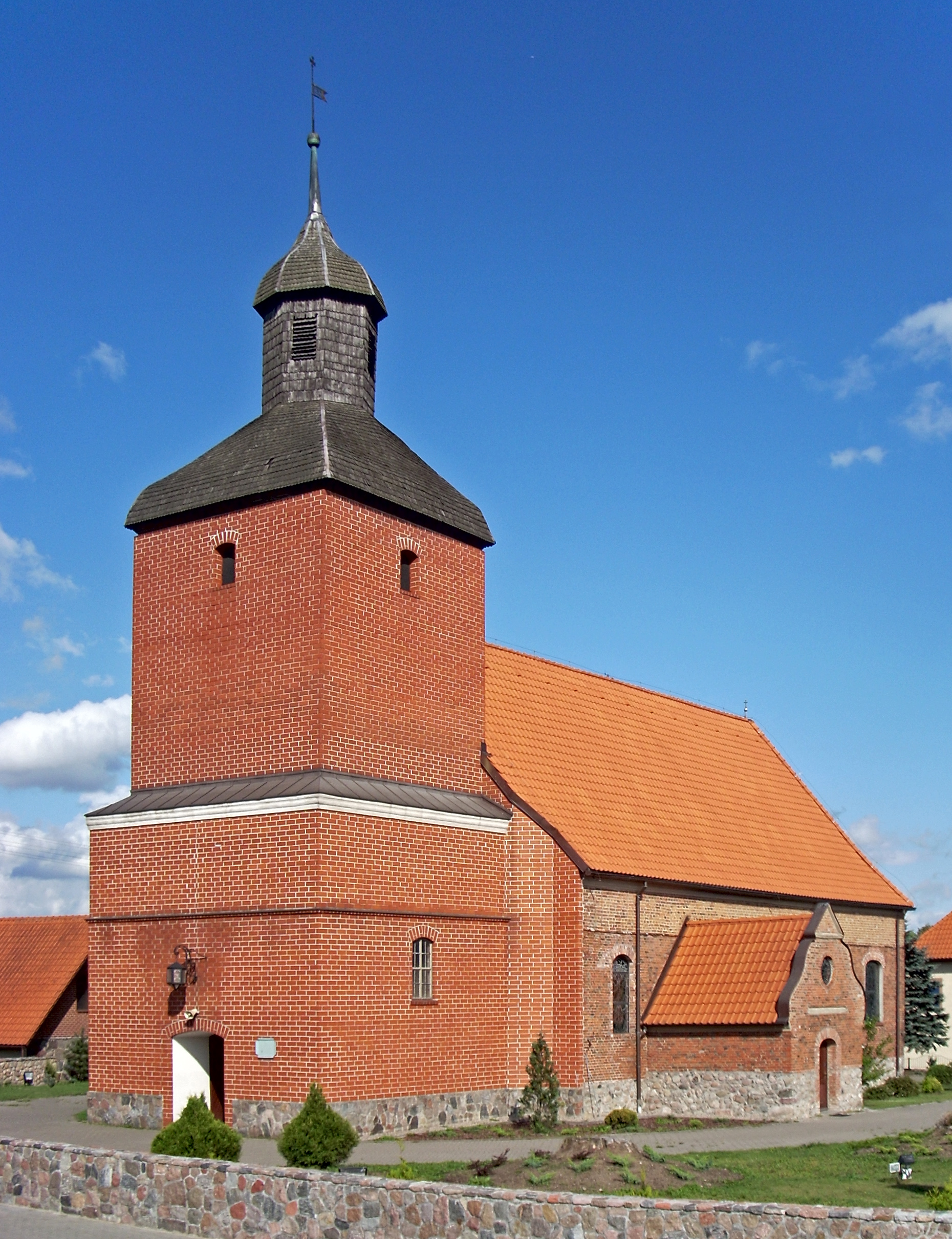
- Church of Saint Catherine of Alexandria

- Location within Poland
- Coordinates: 54°12′19″N 17°56′57″E
- Country: Poland
- Voivodeship: Pomeranian
- County: Kartuzy
- Gmina: Stężyca
- Population: 2,200
- Time zone: UTC+1 (CET)
  - Summer (DST): UTC+2 (CEST)
- Vehicle registration: GKA
- Website: http://www.gminastezyca.pl

Stężyca [stɛ̃ˈʐɨt͡sa] is a village in Kartuzy County, Pomeranian Voivodeship, in northern Poland. It is the seat of the gmina (administrative district) called Gmina Stężyca. It is located between the Stężyckie and Raduńskie Górne lakes within the ethnocultural region of Kashubia in the historic region of Pomerania.

== History ==
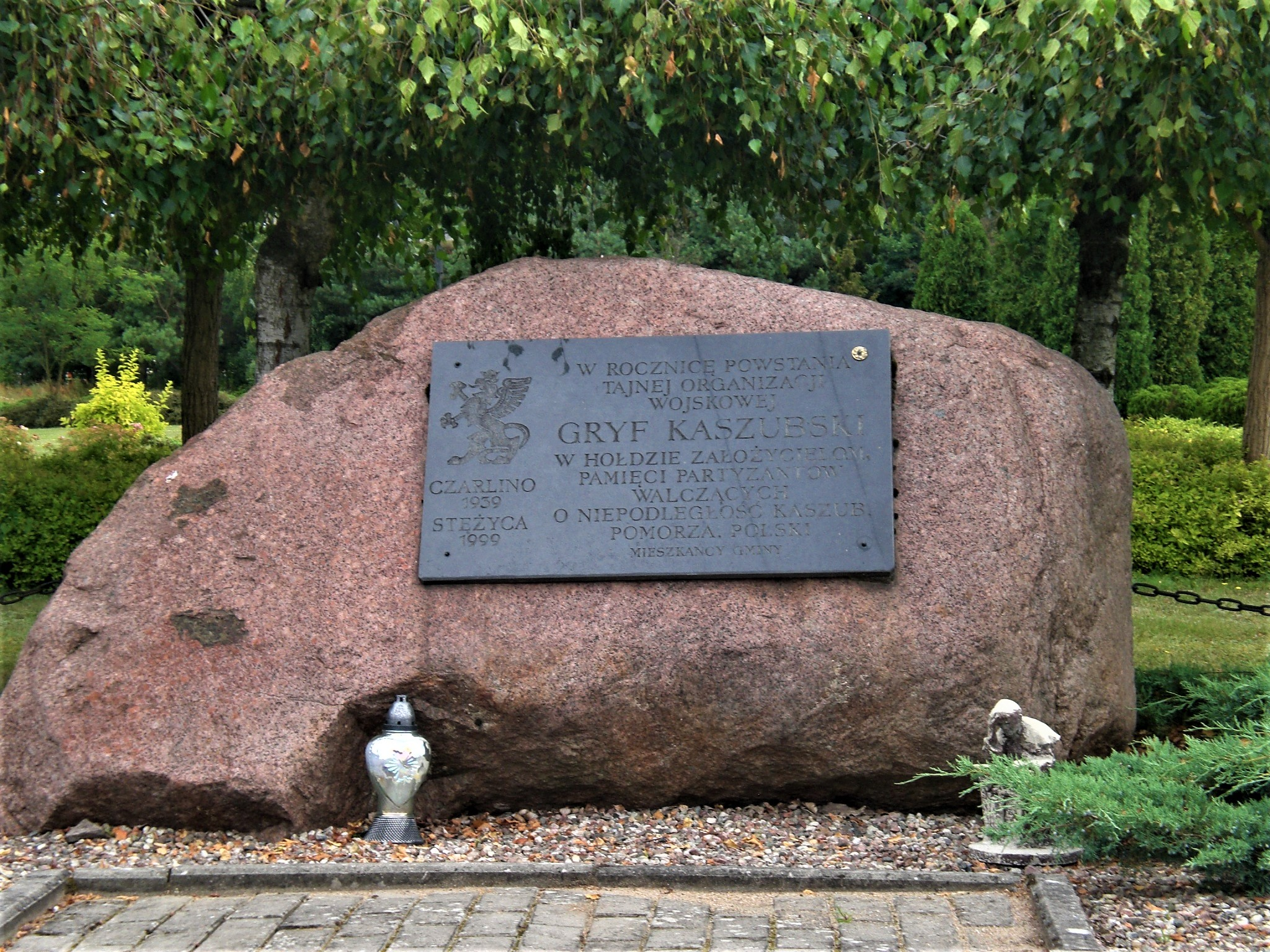
Memorial to the Kashubian Griffin Polish underground resistance organization during World War II

Stężyca was a royal village of the Polish Crown, administratively located in the Tczew County in the Pomeranian Voivodeship.

During the Nazi occupation of Poland (World War II), several Poles from Stężyca, including the local Catholic priest, were murdered in 1939 by the Germans in large massacres in the Kaliska forest (see Intelligenzaktion). Several Polish families were expelled from the village in 1941, and the entire remaining Polish population was expelled in 1943, while their farms were handed over to German colonists as part of the Lebensraum policy.

== Sport ==
The village is home to the football club Radunia Stężyca.
