= Krzeszna-Stacja =

- Village
- Location within Poland
- Coordinates: 54°14′8″N 18°5′29″E
- Country: Poland
- Voivodeship: Pomeranian
- County: Kartuzy
- Gmina: Stężyca

Krzeszna-Stacja [ˈkʂɛʂna ˈstat͡sja] is a village in the administrative district of Gmina Stężyca, within Kartuzy County, Pomeranian Voivodeship, in northern Poland.

For details of the history of the region, see History of Pomerania.
