= Skorzewo railway station =

Railway station in Skorzewo, Poland

Skorzewo
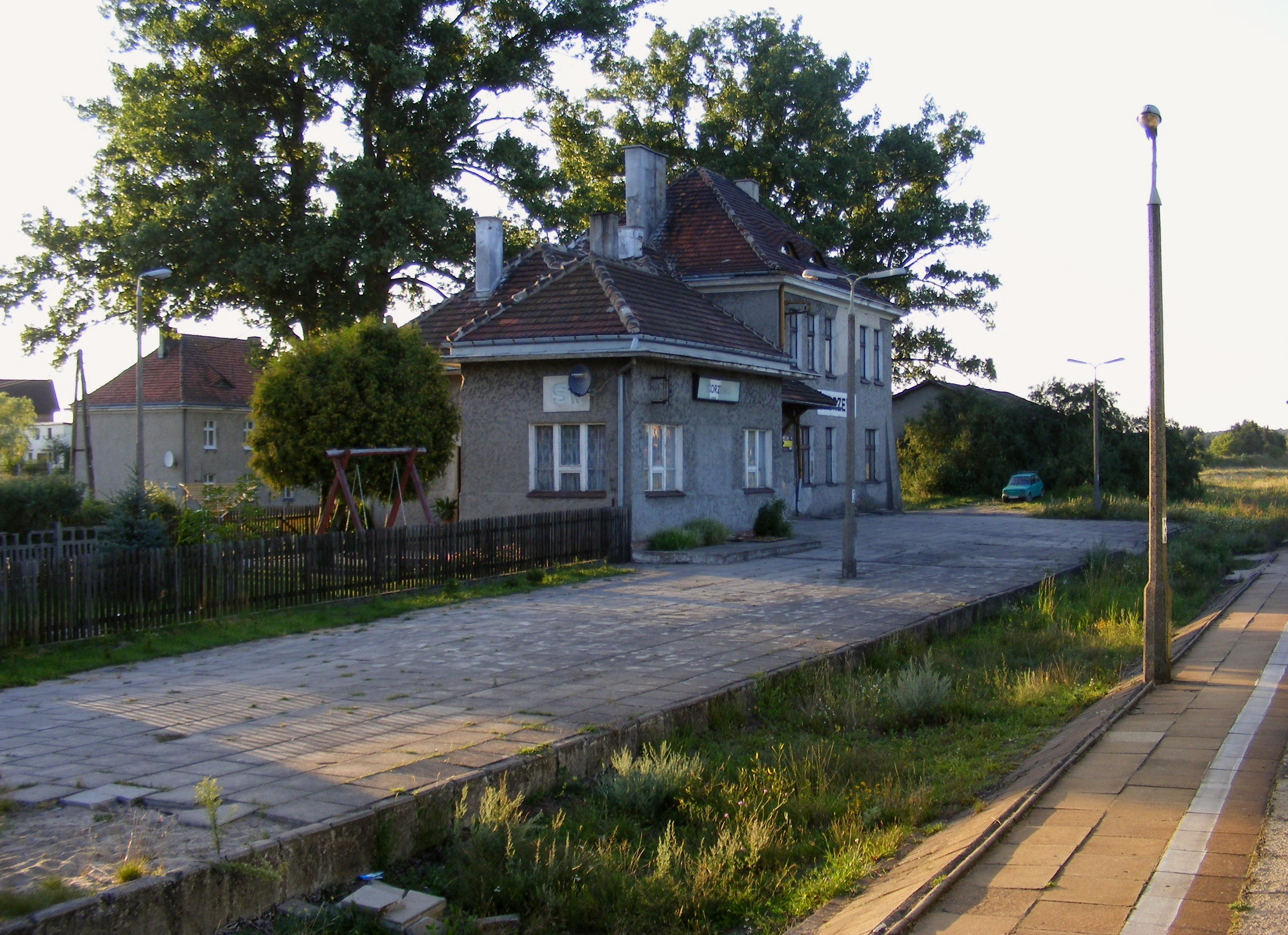
- Skorzewo railway station in 2007

General information
- Location: Skorzewo, Pomeranian Voivodeship; Poland
- System: Railway Station
- Operator: SKM Tricity
- Line: 201: Nowa Wieś Wielka–Gdynia Port railway
- Platforms: 2
- Tracks: 2

History
- Opened: Before 1938
- Rebuilt: 2014
Location
- Location within Poland

Skorzewo railway station is a railway station serving the village of Skorzewo, in the Pomeranian Voivodeship, Poland. The station is located on the Nowa Wieś Wielka–Gdynia Port railway. The train services are operated by SKM Tricity.

The station used to be known as Schörendorf under German occupation.

On 15 June 1969 15:40 between Kościerzyna and Skórzewa an accident occurred. The steam locomotive Ty246-84 collided with steam locomotive Ok1-279. The crash killed 7 people and injured 14.

== Modernisation ==
In 2014 the station was modernised.

== Train services ==
The station is served by the following services:

- Pomorska Kolej Metropolitalna services (R) Kościerzyna — Gdańsk Port Lotniczy (Airport) — Gdańsk Wrzeszcz — Gdynia Główna
- Pomorska Kolej Metropolitalna services (R) Kościerzyna — Gdańsk Osowa — Gdynia Główna

| Preceding station | Polregio | Following station |
|---|---|---|
| Kościerzyna Terminus | PR (Via Gdańsk Osowa) | Gołubie Kaszubskie towards Gdynia Główna |
| Kościerzyna Terminus | PR (Via Gdańsk Port Lotniczy (Airport) and Gdańsk Wrzeszcz) | Gołubie Kaszubskie towards Gdynia Główna |
