= Niebo, Pomeranian Voivodeship =

Niebo
- Settlement
- Location within Poland
- Coordinates: 54°14′7″N 18°6′25″E
- Country: Poland
- Voivodeship: Pomeranian
- County: Kartuzy
- Gmina: Stężyca

Niebo [ˈɲɛbɔ] is a settlement in the administrative district of Gmina Stężyca, within Kartuzy County, Pomeranian Voivodeship, in northern Poland.

For details of the history of the region, see History of Pomerania.
