= Wygoda Łączyńska =

Wygoda Łączyńska, Kashubian: Łątczińskô Wigòda
- Village
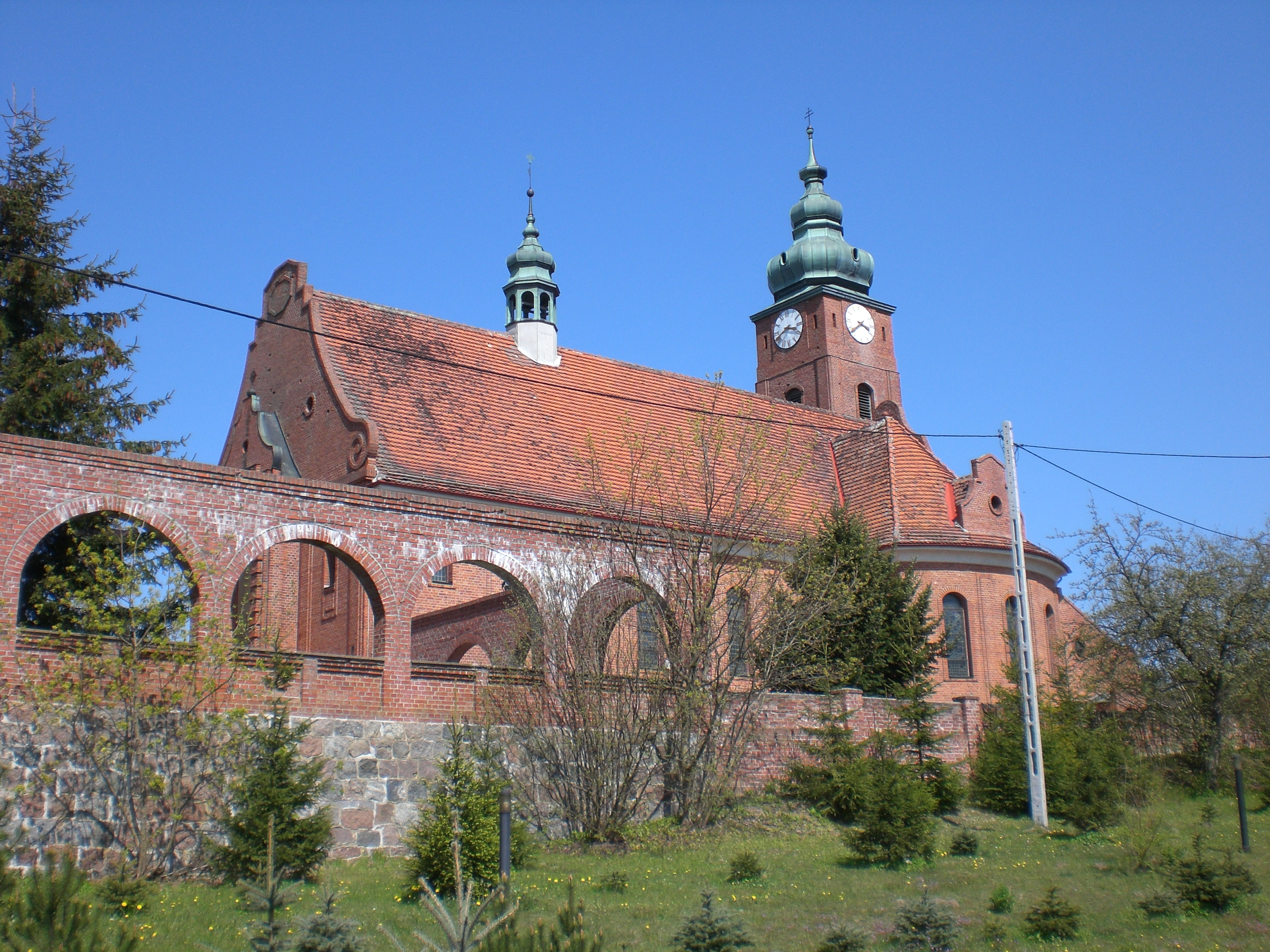
- Saint Joseph Church

- Location within Poland
- Coordinates: 54°17′6″N 17°59′54″E
- Country: Poland
- Voivodeship: Pomeranian
- County: Kartuzy
- Gmina: Stężyca
- Population: 45

Wygoda Łączyńska [vɨˈɡɔda wɔnˈt͡ʂɨɲska] (Kashubian: Łątczińskô Wigòda) is a village in the administrative district of Gmina Stężyca, within Kartuzy County, Pomeranian Voivodeship, in northern Poland.

For details of the history of the region, see History of Pomerania.
