= Niesiołowice, Pomeranian Voivodeship =

Niesiołowice
- Village
- Location within Poland
- Coordinates: 54°12′24″N 17°51′8″E
- Country: Poland
- Voivodeship: Pomeranian
- County: Kartuzy
- Gmina: Stężyca
- Population: 102

Niesiołowice [ɲɛɕɔwɔˈvit͡sɛ] is a village in the administrative district of Gmina Stężyca, within Kartuzy County, Pomeranian Voivodeship, in northern Poland.

For details of the history of the region, see History of Pomerania.
