= Zgorzałe =

- Village
- Location within Poland
- Coordinates: 54°14′11″N 17°59′7″E
- Country: Poland
- Voivodeship: Pomeranian
- County: Kartuzy
- Gmina: Stężyca
- Population: 309

Zgorzałe [zɡɔˈʐawɛ] is a village in the administrative district of Gmina Stężyca, within Kartuzy County, Pomeranian Voivodeship, in northern Poland.

For details of the history of the region, see History of Pomerania.

In Zgorzałe there is the first street in Poland named Lech Wałęsa Street (2009).
