= Betlejem, Pomeranian Voivodeship =

Village in Poland

Betlejem
- Settlement
- Location within Poland
- Coordinates: 54°12′47″N 17°53′32″E
- Country: Poland
- Voivodeship: Pomeranian
- County: Kartuzy
- Gmina: Stężyca

Betlejem [bɛˈtlɛjɛm] is a settlement in the administrative district of Gmina Stężyca, within Kartuzy County, Pomeranian Voivodeship, in northern Poland.
