= Mała Krzeszna =

- Village
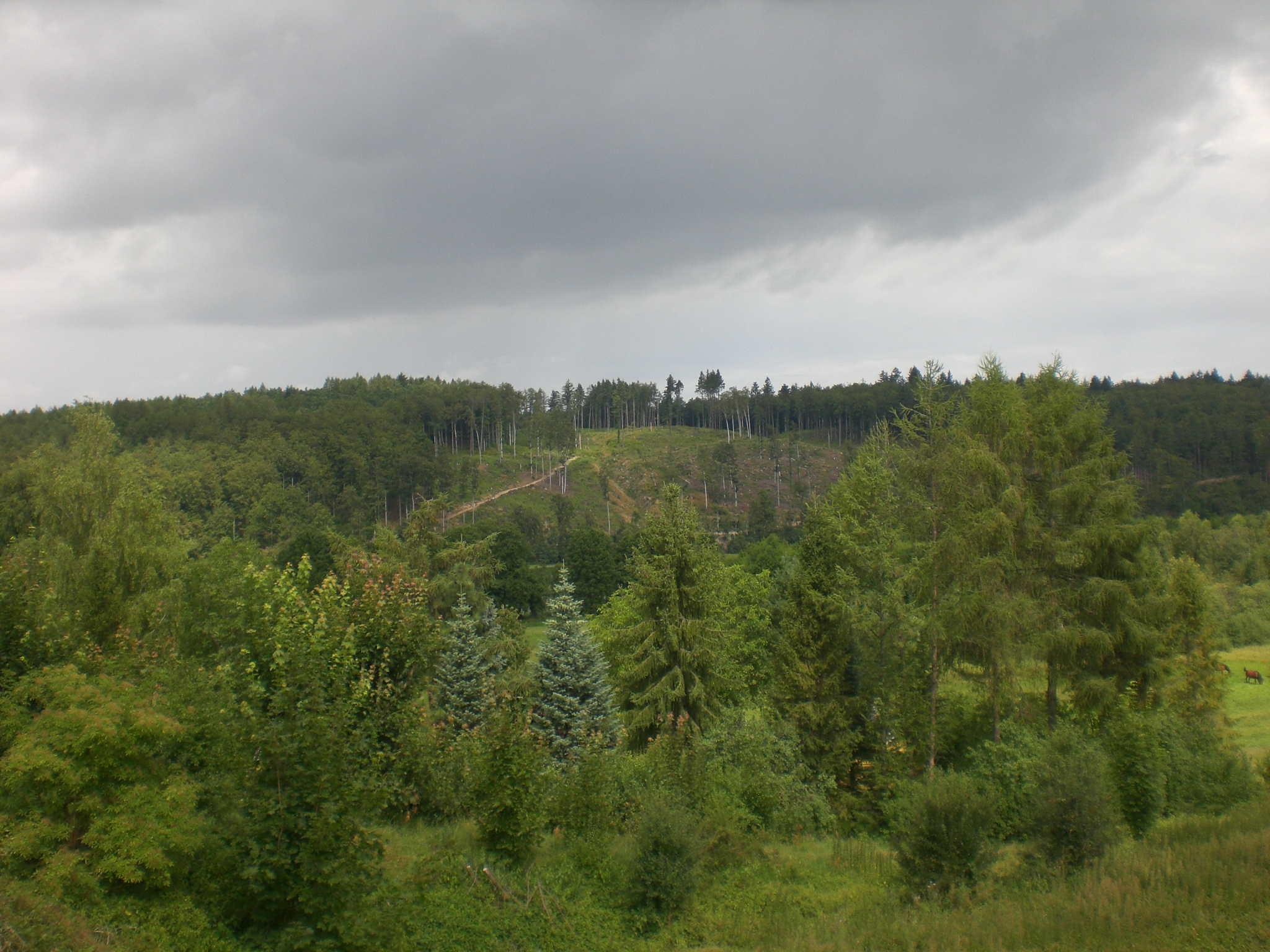

- Location within Poland
- Coordinates: 54°13′34″N 18°4′3″E
- Country: Poland
- Voivodeship: Pomeranian
- County: Kartuzy
- Gmina: Stężyca

Mała Krzeszna [ˈmawa ˈkʂɛʂna] is a village in the administrative district of Gmina Stężyca, within Kartuzy County, Pomeranian Voivodeship, in Northern Poland.

For details of the history of the region, see History of Pomerania.
