= Sikorzyno =

- Village
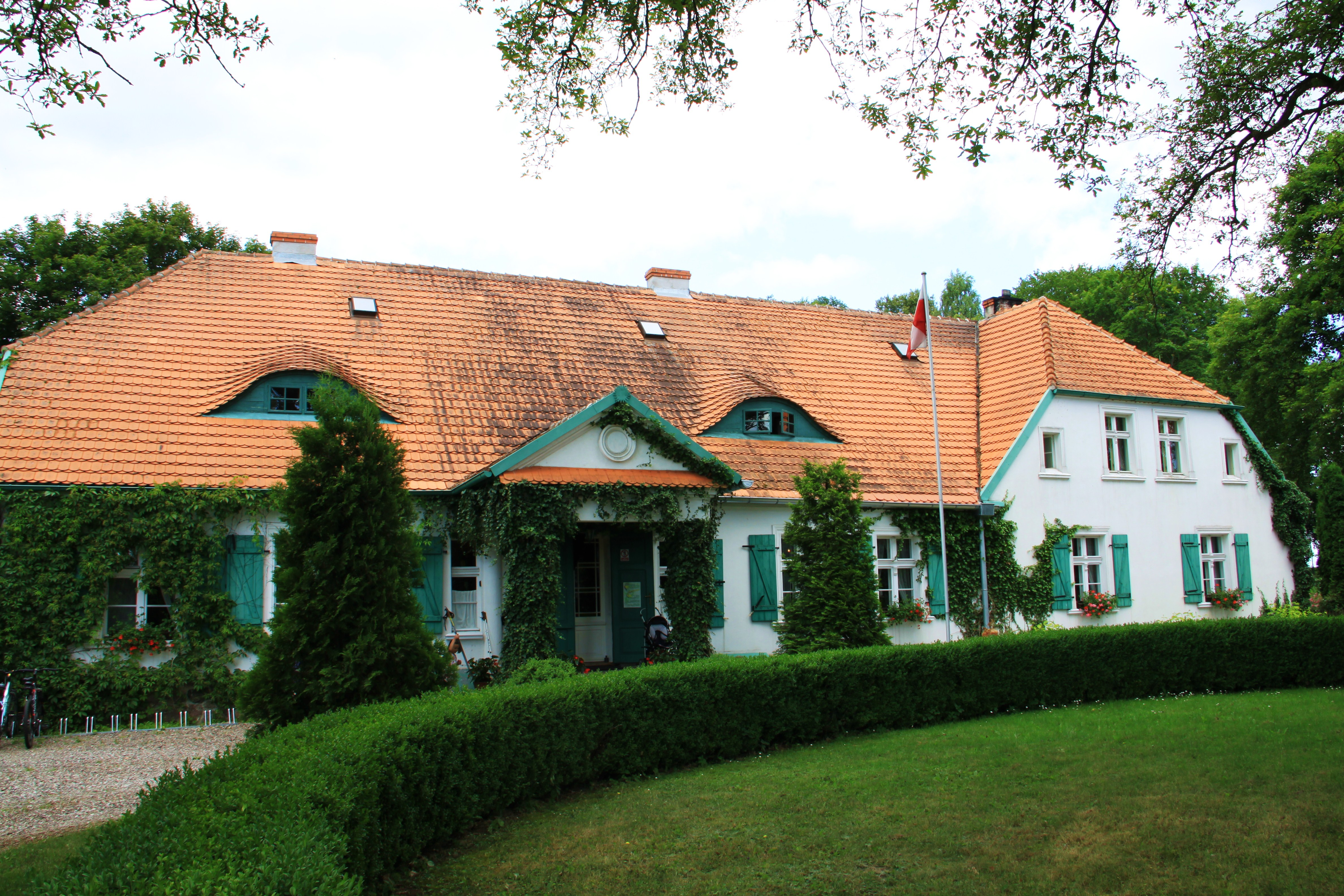
- Wybicki Manor in Sikorzyno

- Location within Poland
- Coordinates: 54°11′23″N 18°1′26″E
- Country: Poland
- Voivodeship: Pomeranian
- County: Kartuzy
- Gmina: Stężyca

Population
  - Total: 380

Sikorzyno [ɕikɔˈʐɨnɔ] is a village in the administrative district of Gmina Stężyca, within Kartuzy County, Pomeranian Voivodeship, in northern Poland. It is located in the ethnocultural region of Kashubia in the historic region of Pomerania.

Seven Polish citizens were murdered by Nazi Germany in the village during World War II.
