= Żuromino =

- Village
- Location within Poland
- Coordinates: 54°14′6″N 17°57′50″E
- Country: Poland
- Voivodeship: Pomeranian
- County: Kartuzy
- Gmina: Stężyca
- Population: 268

Żuromino [ʐurɔˈminɔ] is a village in the administrative district of Gmina Stężyca, within Kartuzy County, Pomeranian Voivodeship, in northern Poland.

For details of the history of the region, see History of Pomerania.
