= Dąbniak =

- Settlement
- Location within Poland
- Coordinates: 54°15′46″N 17°55′12″E
- Country: Poland
- Voivodeship: Pomeranian
- County: Kartuzy
- Gmina: Stężyca

Dąbniak [ˈdɔmbɲak] is a settlement in the administrative district of Gmina Stężyca, within Kartuzy County, Pomeranian Voivodeship, in northern Poland.

For details of the history of the region, see History of Pomerania.
