= Nowe Czaple, Pomeranian Voivodeship =

Nowe Czaple
- Village
- Location within Poland
- Coordinates: 54°14′59″N 18°3′43″E
- Country: Poland
- Voivodeship: Pomeranian
- County: Kartuzy
- Gmina: Stężyca
- Population: 163

Nowe Czaple [ˈnɔvɛ ˈt͡ʂaplɛ] is a village in the administrative district of Gmina Stężyca, within Kartuzy County, Pomeranian Voivodeship, in northern Poland.

For details of the history of the region, see History of Pomerania.
