= Pustka, Kartuzy County =

Pustka
- Settlement
- Location within Poland
- Coordinates: 54°11′26″N 17°50′6″E
- Country: Poland
- Voivodeship: Pomeranian
- County: Kartuzy
- Gmina: Stężyca
- Population: 10

Pustka [ˈpustka] is a settlement in the administrative district of Gmina Stężyca, within Kartuzy County, Pomeranian Voivodeship, in northern Poland.

For details of the history of the region, see History of Pomerania.
