= Pażęce =

- Settlement
- Location within Poland
- Coordinates: 54°12′1″N 17°55′44″E
- Country: Poland
- Voivodeship: Pomeranian
- County: Kartuzy
- Gmina: Stężyca
- Population: 6

Pażęce [paˈʐɛnt͡sɛ] is a settlement in the administrative district of Gmina Stężyca, within Kartuzy County, Pomeranian Voivodeship, in northern Poland.

For details of the history of the region, see History of Pomerania.
