= Nowy Ostrów, Kartuzy County =

Nowy Ostrów
- Village
- Location within Poland
- Coordinates: 54°17′14″N 17°54′7″E
- Country: Poland
- Voivodeship: Pomeranian
- County: Kartuzy
- Gmina: Stężyca
- Population: 32

Nowy Ostrów (Polish pronunciation: [ˈnɔvɨ ˈɔstruf]) is a village in the administrative district of Gmina Stężyca, within Kartuzy County, Pomeranian Voivodeship, in northern Poland.
