= Gołubie =

- Village
- Location within Poland
- Coordinates: 54°12′43″N 18°1′35″E
- Country: Poland
- Voivodeship: Pomeranian
- County: Kartuzy
- Gmina: Stężyca
- Elevation: 170 m (560 ft)
- Population: 755

Gołubie [ɡɔˈwubjɛ] is a village in the administrative district of Gmina Stężyca, within Kartuzy County, Pomeranian Voivodeship, in northern Poland.

For details of the history of the region, see History of Pomerania.

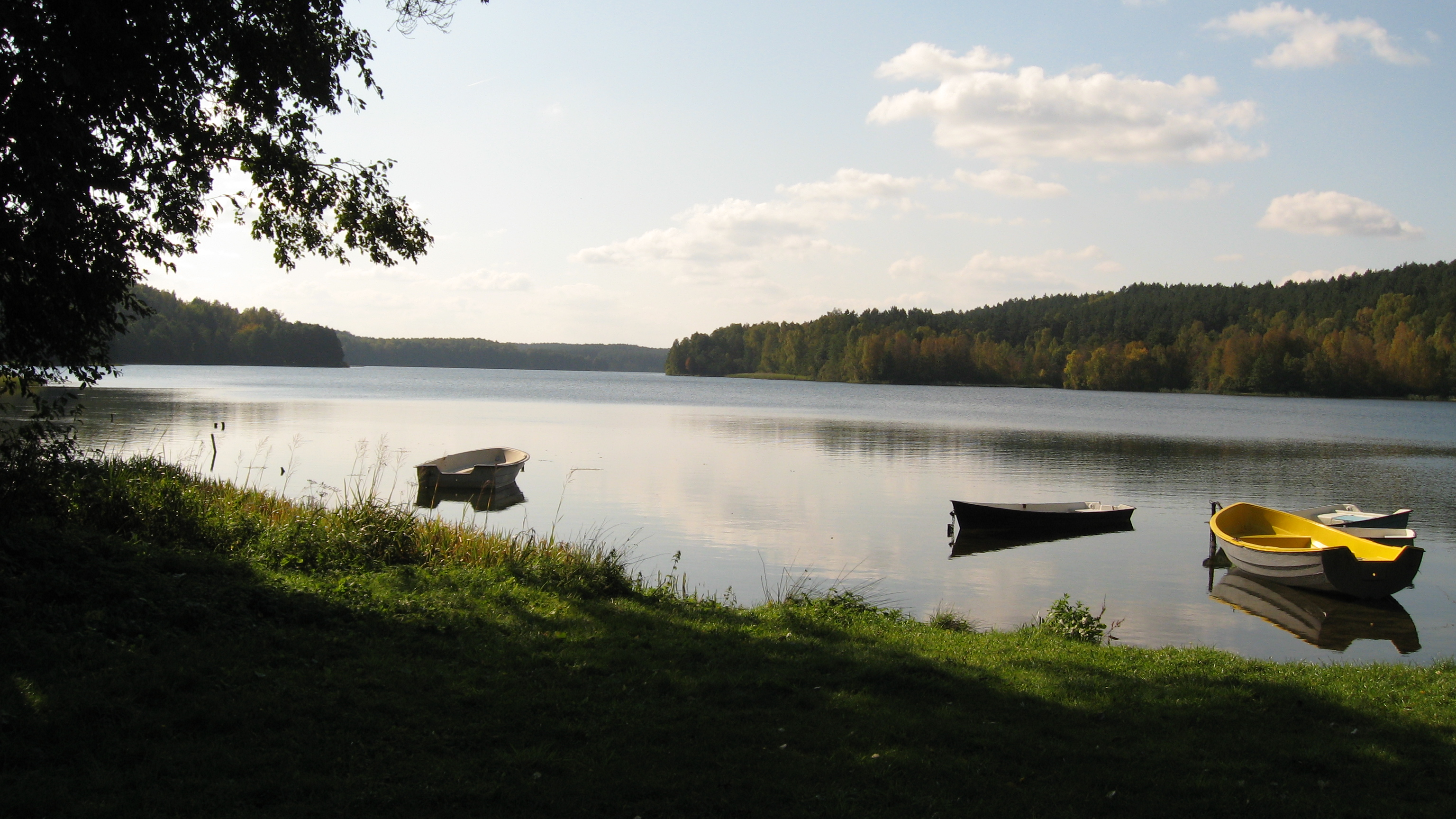
Dabrowskie Lake in Gołubie
