= Piekło, Kartuzy County =

Piekło
- Settlement
- Location within Poland
- Coordinates: 54°14′4″N 18°6′18″E
- Country: Poland
- Voivodeship: Pomeranian
- County: Kartuzy
- Gmina: Stężyca

Piekło [ˈpjɛkwɔ] is a settlement in the administrative district of Gmina Stężyca, within Kartuzy County, Pomeranian Voivodeship, in northern Poland.

For details of the history of the region, see History of Pomerania.
