= Wieżyca, Kartuzy County =

Wieżyca Wieżëca
- Village
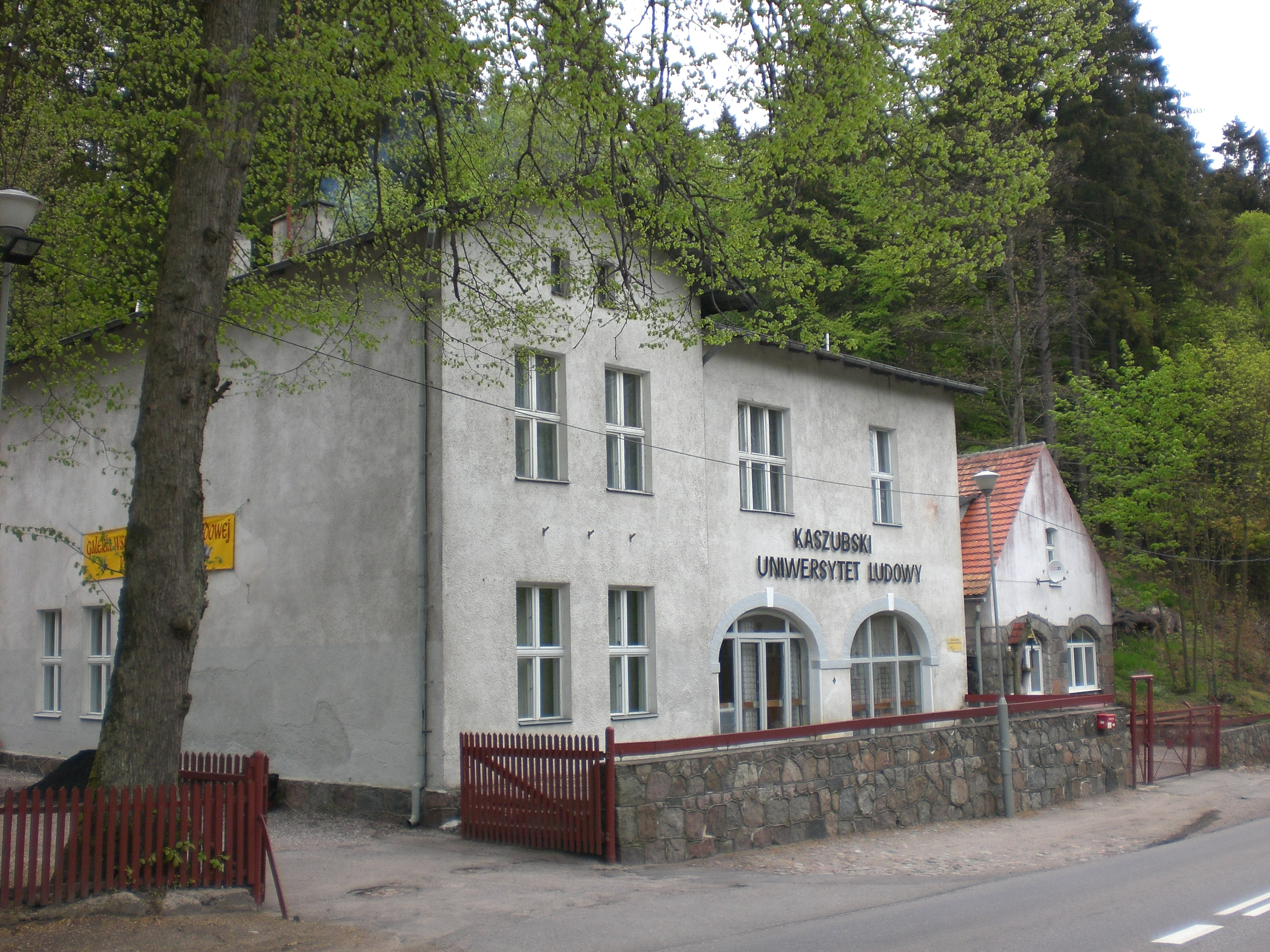
- The Kashubian folk high school in the village

- Location within Poland
- Coordinates: 54°14′3″N 18°7′40″E
- Country: Poland
- Voivodeship: Pomeranian
- County: Kartuzy
- Gmina: Stężyca

Wieżyca [vjɛˈʐɨt͡sa] (Kashubian: Wieżëca) is a village in the administrative district of Gmina Stężyca, within Kartuzy County, Pomeranian Voivodeship, in northern Poland.

For details of the history of the region, see History of Pomerania.
