= Crooked House (disambiguation) =

Crooked House is an Agatha Christie novel.

Crooked House may also refer to:

== Arts ==
- Crooked House (TV series), a 2008 BBC TV series
- Crooked House (film), a 2017 film directed by Gilles Paquet-Brenner
- "'—And He Built a Crooked House—'", a 1941 short story by Robert A. Heinlein

== Buildings ==
- The Crooked House, a former public house in Staffordshire, England
- Crooked House of Windsor, a tea house in Windsor, Berkshire, England
- The Crooked House, the building containing the Catching Lives Bookshop in Canterbury, England

== See also ==
- Krzywy Domek (Crooked House), in Sopot, Poland
- The Mystery at the Crooked House, a book in the Boxcar Children Series
