= Krzywy Domek =

Unusually shaped building in Sopot, Poland

Coordinates: 54°26′38.91″N 18°34′0.3″E

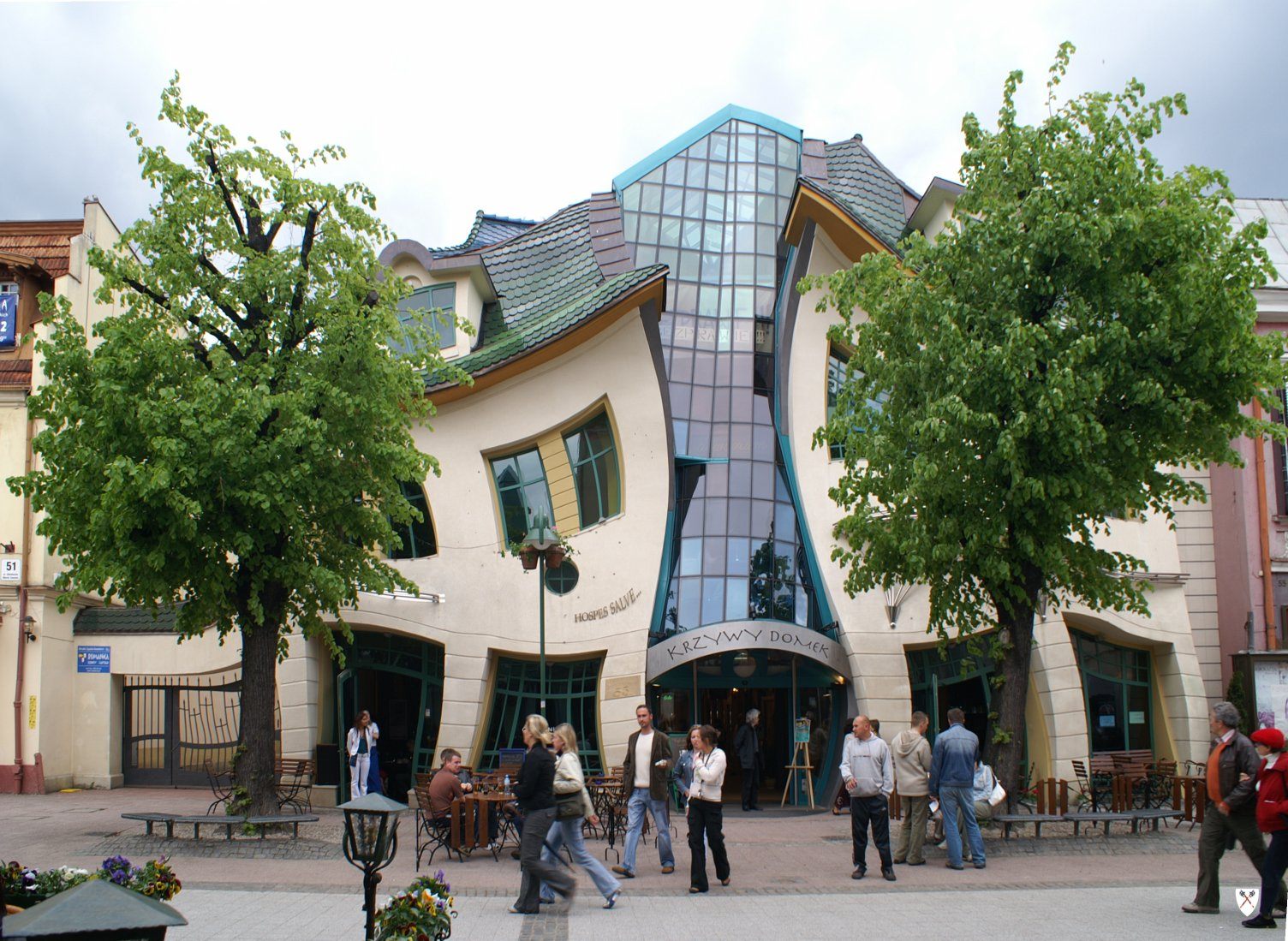
- The Krzywy Domek

General information
- Architectural style: Postmodern
- Location: Bohaterów Monte Cassino 53, 81-767 Sopot, Poland
- Completed: 2004

Design and construction
- Architecture firm: Szotyńscy & Zaleski

Website
- https://krzywydomek.info/

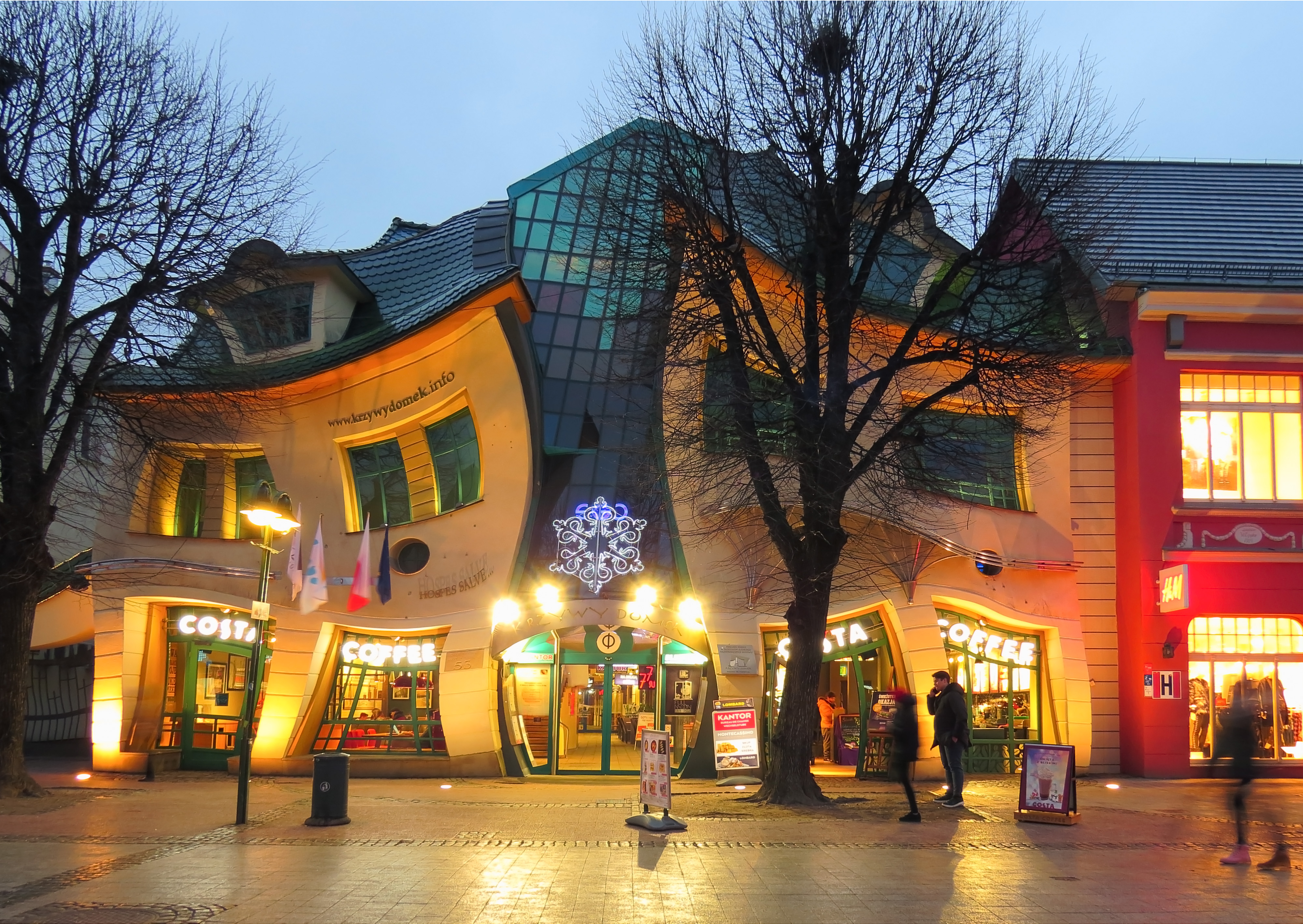
During the night

Krzywy Domek (pronounced [ˈkʂɨvɨ ˈd̪ɔmɛk], Polish for "crooked little house") is an unusually shaped building in Sopot, Poland.

Krzywy Domek was built in 2004. It is about 4,000 square meters (43,000 sq ft) in size and is part of the Rezydent shopping center.

It was designed by Szotyńscy & Zaleski, who were inspired by the fairytale illustrations and drawings of Jan Marcin Szancer and Per Dahlberg. It can be entered from either Monte Cassino or Morska Streets.

== Gallery ==
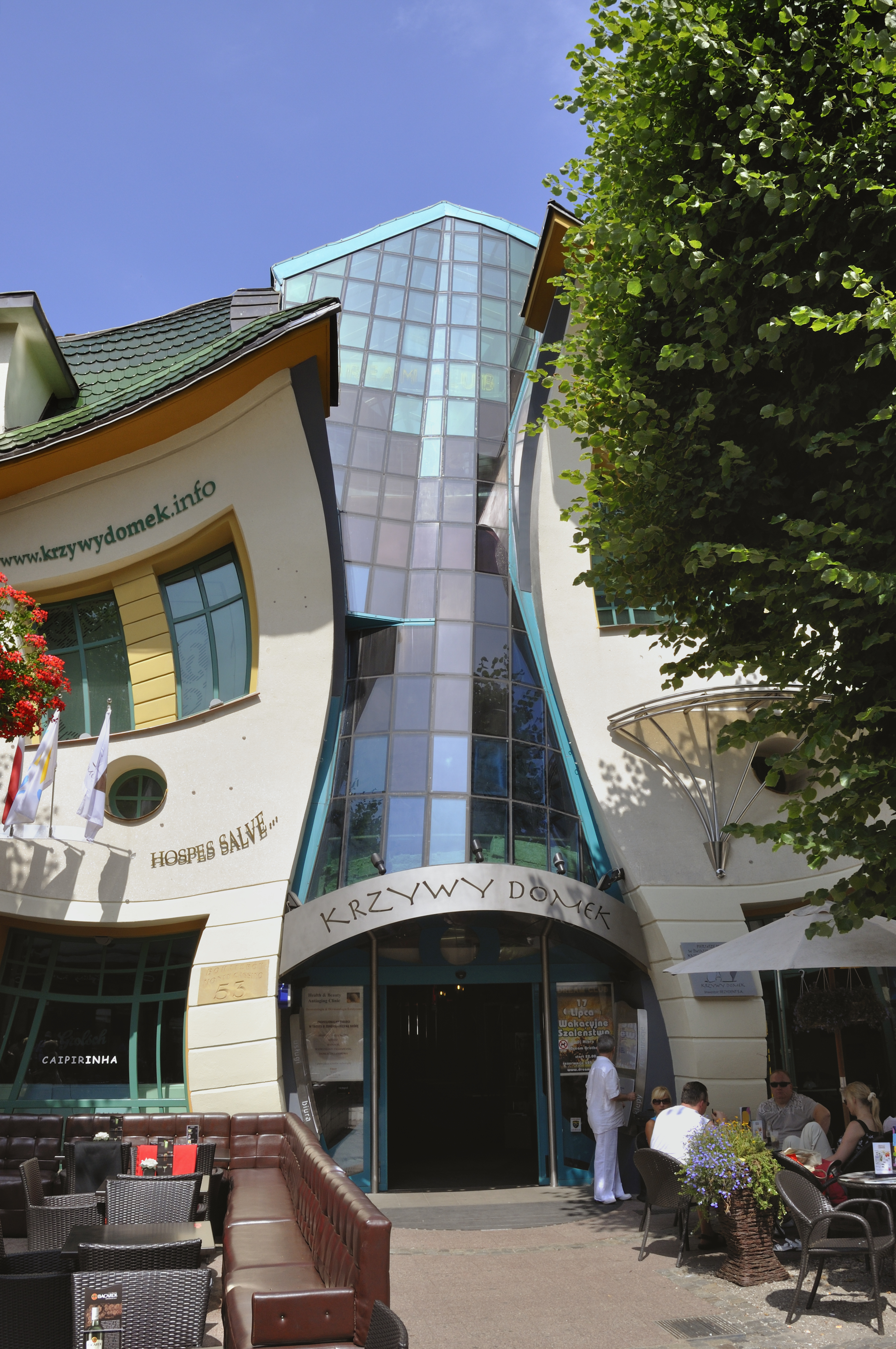
Entrance

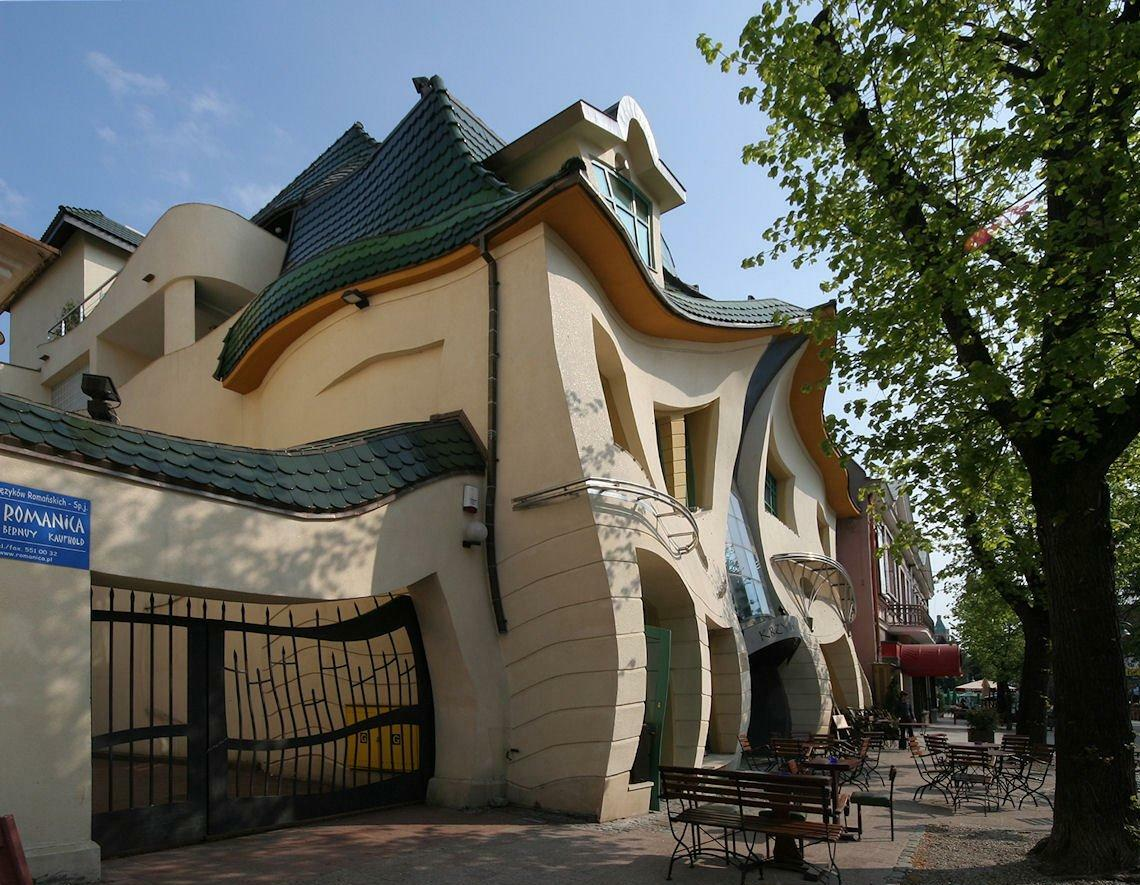
Side view

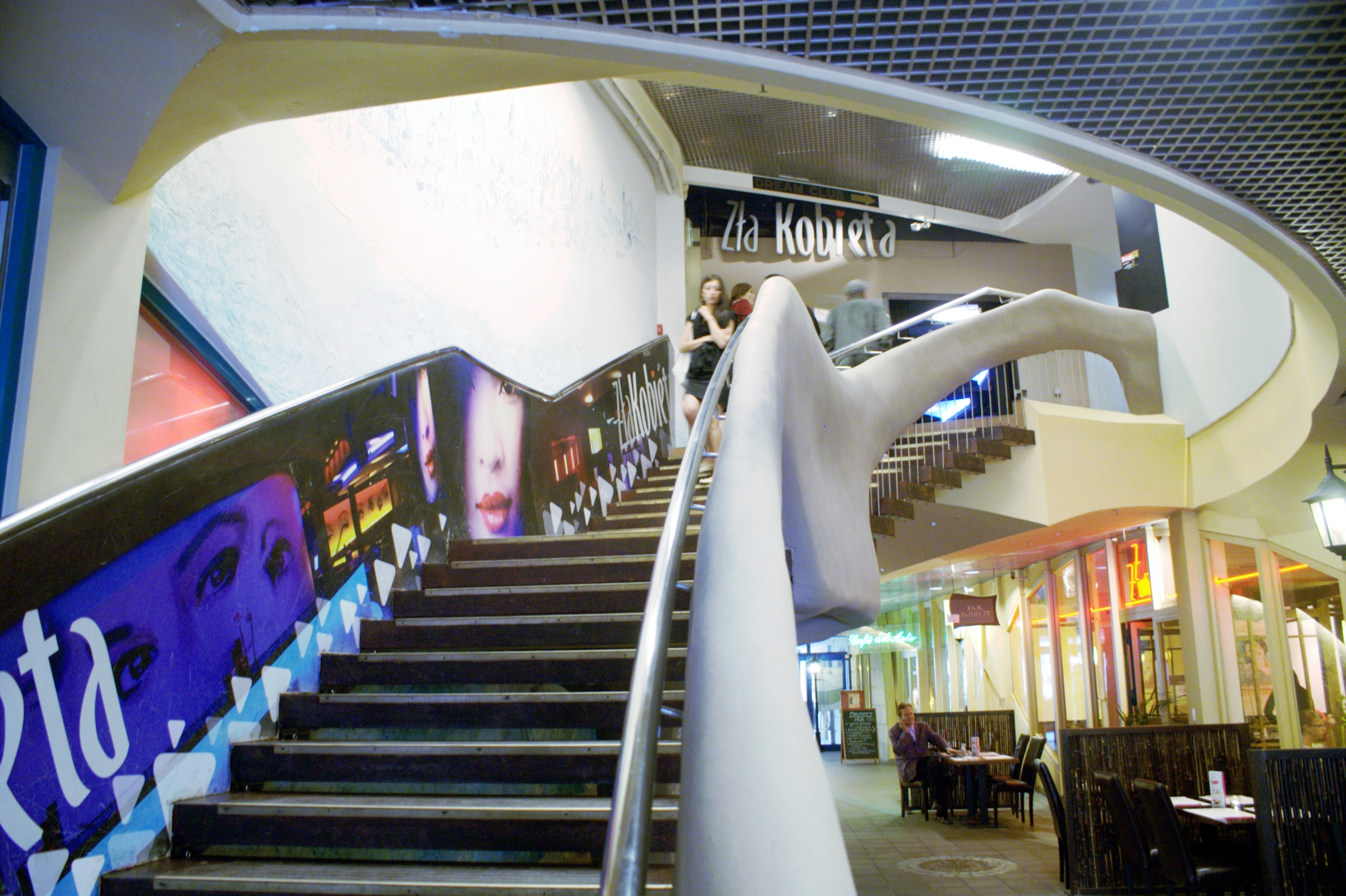
Interior

== See also ==
- Dancing House
- Crooked Forest
- The Crooked House
- Crooked House of Windsor
