= Scrine =

Scrine is a surname. Notable people with the surname include:

- Frank Scrine (1925–2001), Welsh footballer
- Fred Scrine (1877–1962), Welsh rugby union player

== See also ==
- Catching Lives
