= Sopot Pier =

Pier in Sopot, Poland

Coordinates: 54.447778°N 18.576111°E

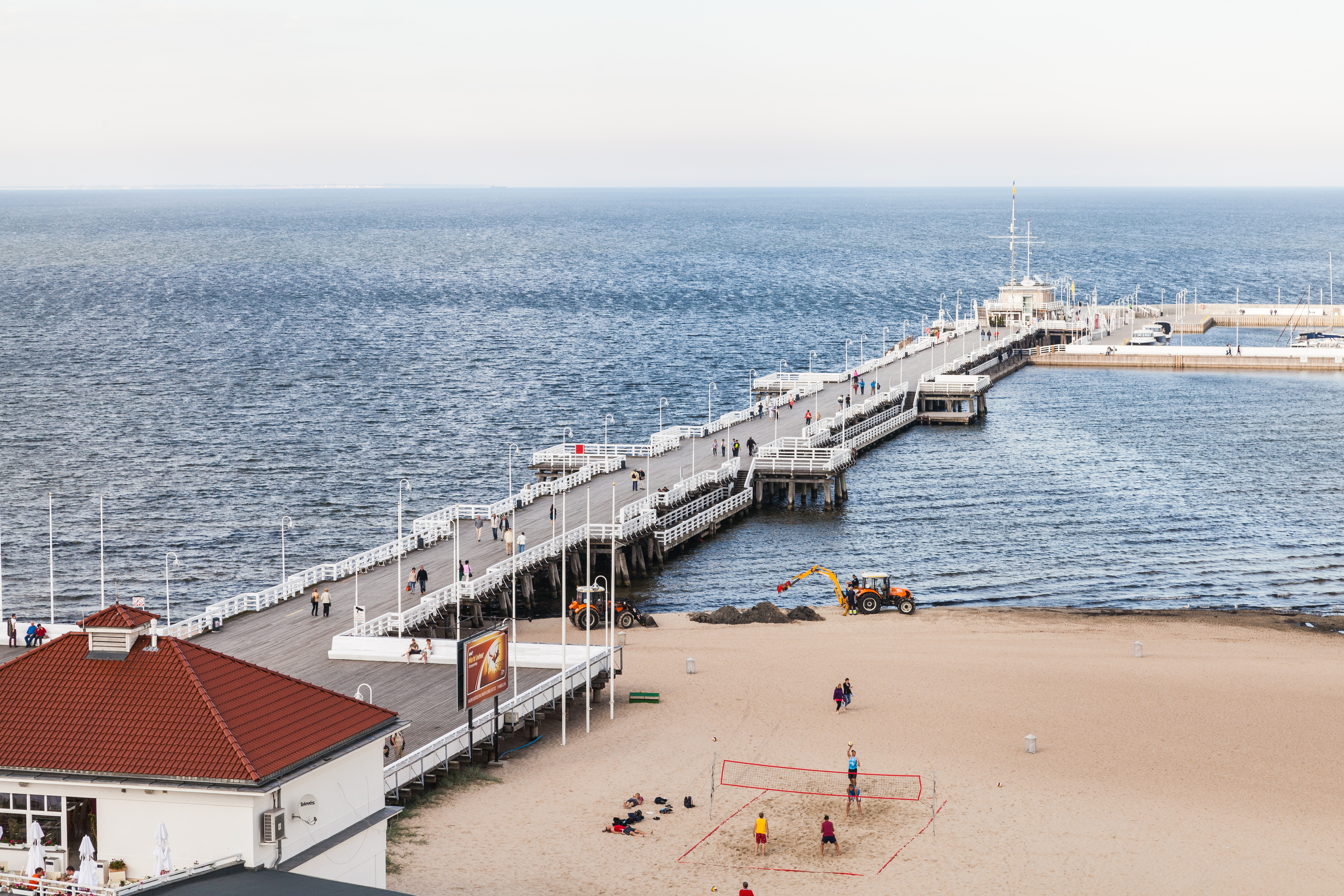
The Sopot Pier

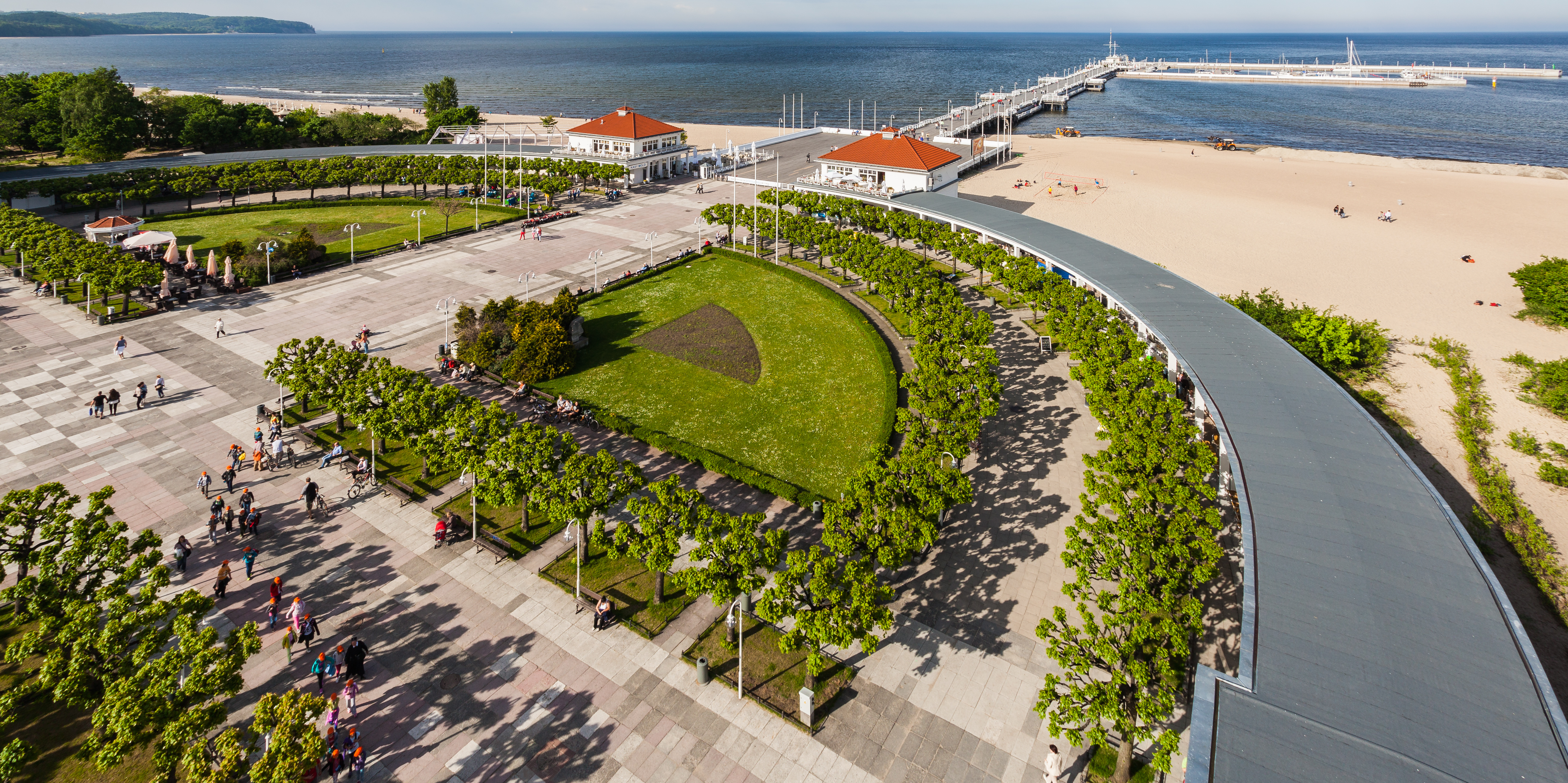
The Spa Square and Sopot pier viewed from the Sopot Lighthouse

The Sopot Pier (Polish: Molo w Sopocie) is the pier in the city of Sopot, Poland on the Gdańsk Bay, built as a pleasure pier and as a mooring point for cruise boats. It first opened in 1827, and at 511.5 metres (1,678 ft), the pier is the longest wooden pier in Europe. It stretches into the sea from the middle of Sopot beach which is a popular venue for recreation and health walks (the concentration of iodine at the tip of the pier is twice as high as on land) or public entertainment events, and it also serves as a mooring point for cruise boats and water taxis. It is also an excellent point for observing the World Sailing Championship, the Baltic Windsurfing Cup and the Sopot Triathlon taking place on the bay. Sopot pier consists of 2 parts: the famous wooden walking jetty and the Spa Square on land, where concerts and festivities are organised.

In contrast, Southend Pier, the longest pier in Europe is 2,158 metres (7,080 ft) long but constructed primarily of iron, unlike the wooden Sopot Pier.

== History ==
The first pier was built in 1827, next rebuilt to the length of 150 metres, then to 315 m. It was brought to the contemporary length in 1928, along with the walking passage of the spa. The first non-wooden elements appeared after 1990, when the head was modernised using steel elements. Nowadays the pier is a grade I listed building.

The Pier served as the pit stop in the fifth leg of The Amazing Race 23.

== See also ==
Pier in Płock
