= Sierakowski Manor House =

Building in Sopot, Poland

Coordinates: 54.4445°N 18.5629°E

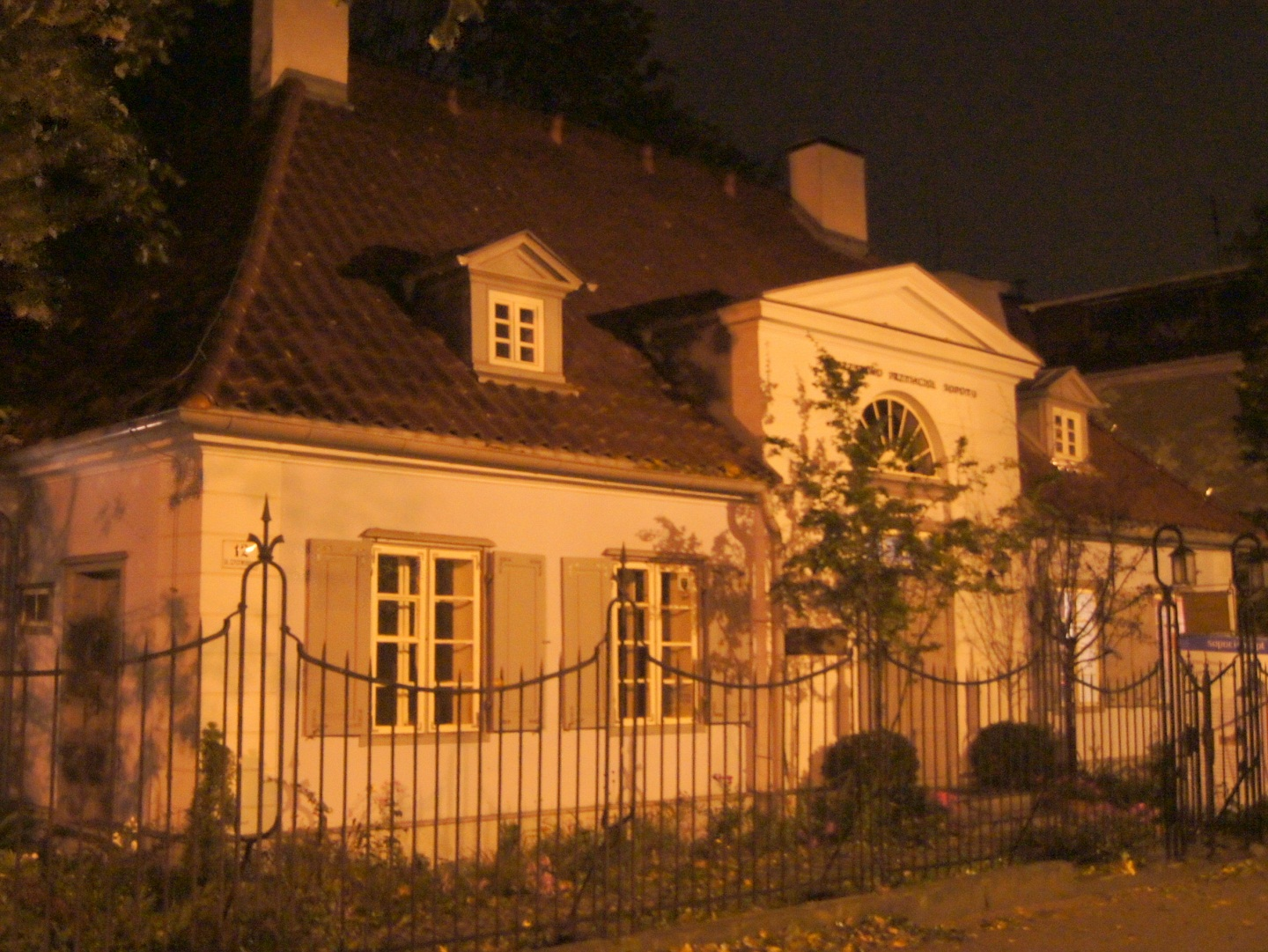
Sierakowski manor in Sopot, Poland

The Sierakowski Manor House (Polish: Dworek Sierakowskich), one of the oldest buildings in Sopot, Poland, is the seat of the Society of the Friends of Sopot (Towarzystwo Przyjaciół Sopotu). There is an art gallery which holds exhibitions all over the year, the Mansion provides a venue for meetings organized under a "Theatre at the Table" world dramaturgy series ("Teatr przy stole") and musical evenings on Thursdays ("Czwartkowe Wieczory Muzyczne") - meetings that feature chamber music, organized without a break since 1974.
