= Jean Georg Haffner =

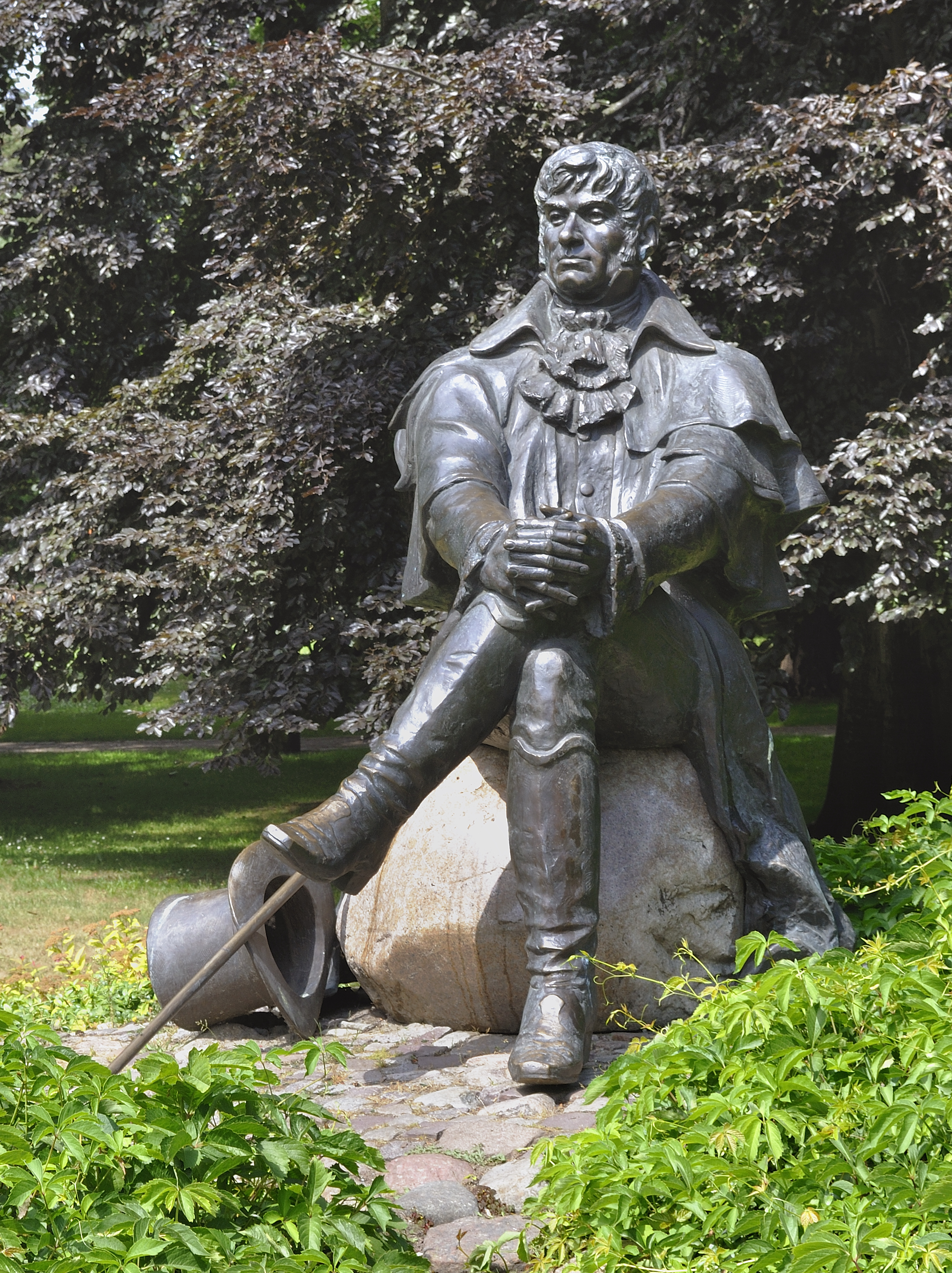
Monument of Jean Georg Haffner in the Sopot North Park

Jean Georg Haffner (1777 in Colmar in Alsace – 20 April 1830 in Danzig) was a medical doctor and the founder of the first spa located in Zoppot (Sopot).

Johann (Jean) Georg Haffner came to the Free City of Danzig in 1808 as a major of Napoleons's Grande Armée. He was garrisoned there with the French army in which he served as a surgeon. In Danzig he married in 1808 Regina Karoline Bruns, widow of Johann Christoph Böttcher. Since 1811 he was practicing in the town as a civil medical doctor too. He was also running a swimming bath. In addition, he carried out injections against cowpox. When the French troops withdrew from the region in 1814, Haffner remained in Danzig.

In 1823 Haffner obtained the license and the exclusive right to establish and operate a spa type of seaside resort in Zoppot from the Prussian authorities. The land along the beach, which was needed to realize the project, was handed over to him on the basis of hereditary leasehold. He built and financed himself a spa hotel and a number of bath pavilions. The spa type of recreation and health centre founded by him had triggered off Zoppot's later development into a famous and noble spa resort.

== Literature ==
- Altpreußische Biographie (Christian Krollmann, ed.), vol.1, 1941, p. 305.
