= Grodzisko in Sopot =

Coordinates: 54.45202°N 18.55928°E

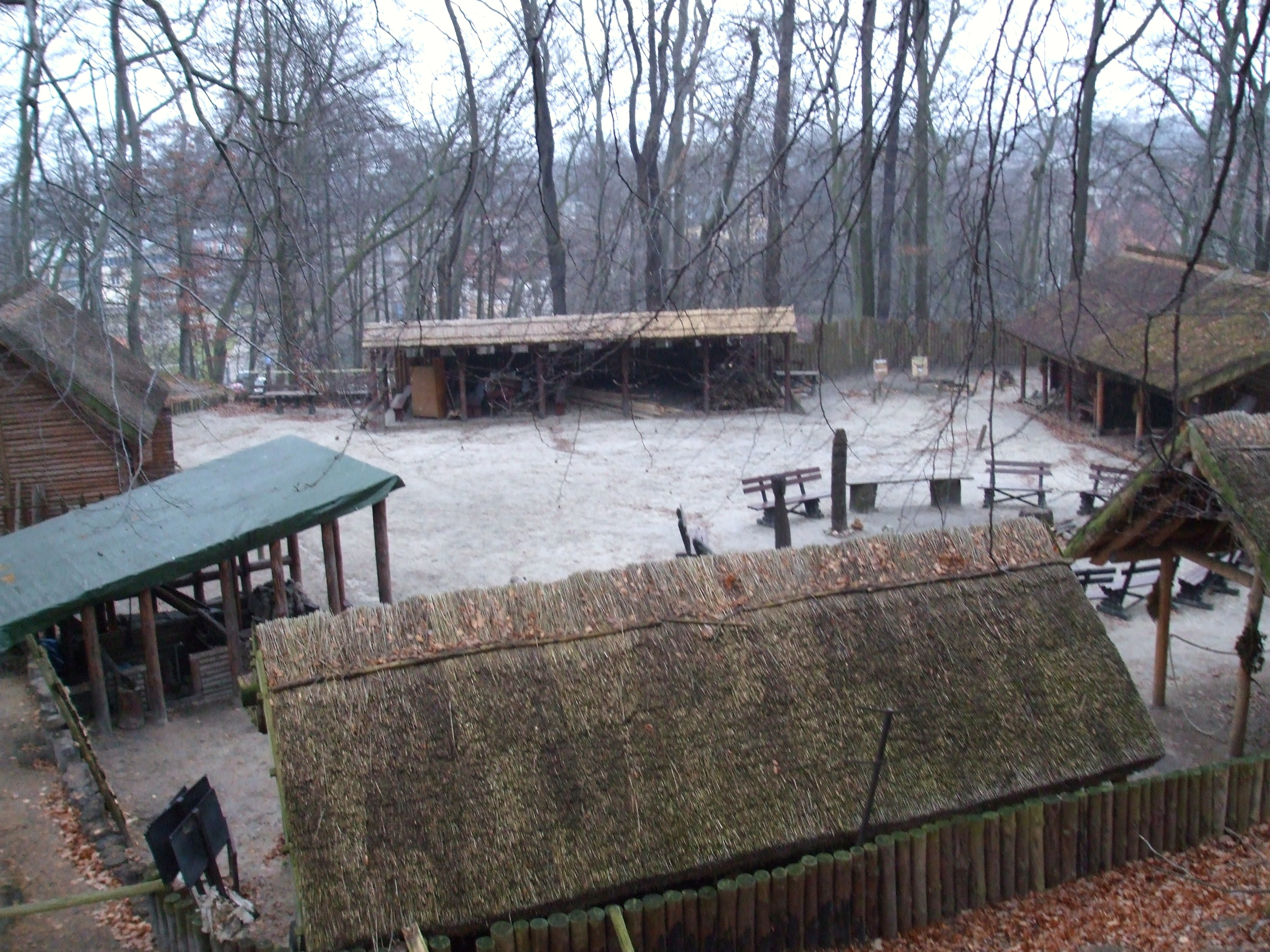
Grodzisko in Sopot

Grodzisko in Sopot is an early medieval settlement in the city of Sopot surrounded by ramparts and a moat, covered with beech forest. It operates as a heritage park and is a department of the Archaeological museum in Gdańsk.

The stronghold in Sopot is a branch of the Archaeological Museum in Gdańsk. Popularly known as "Zamkowa Mountain" or "Frying Pan", it is located at 63 Haffner Street. It is the oldest monument in Sopot. The fortified settlement is a remnant of a fortified settlement that existed from the 8th-10th centuries. It is situated 400 m from the seashore, on a picturesque, wooded hill with two streams flowing in deep ravines on the sides. At the top of the hill, on a 45 x 49.5 m yard, the buildings of the castle were reconstructed: huts, gate and palisade, making efforts to create exactly in the places where their traces were uncovered during excavation works carried out by employees of the Archaeological Museum in Gdańsk. In the exhibition pavilion at the foot of the settlement there is an exhibition of relics obtained during the research conducted here. The open-air museum organizes picnics and archaeological festivals, shows of old crafts, workshops, and introduces the everyday life of the former inhabitants of Pomerania. During the school year, "living history" lessons are held here, popular science readings and open days are organized. It is a meeting place for history and archeology enthusiasts.
