= Sopot =

City in Pomeranian Voivodeship, Poland

Sopot Sopòt (Kashubian) Zoppot (German)
- City county
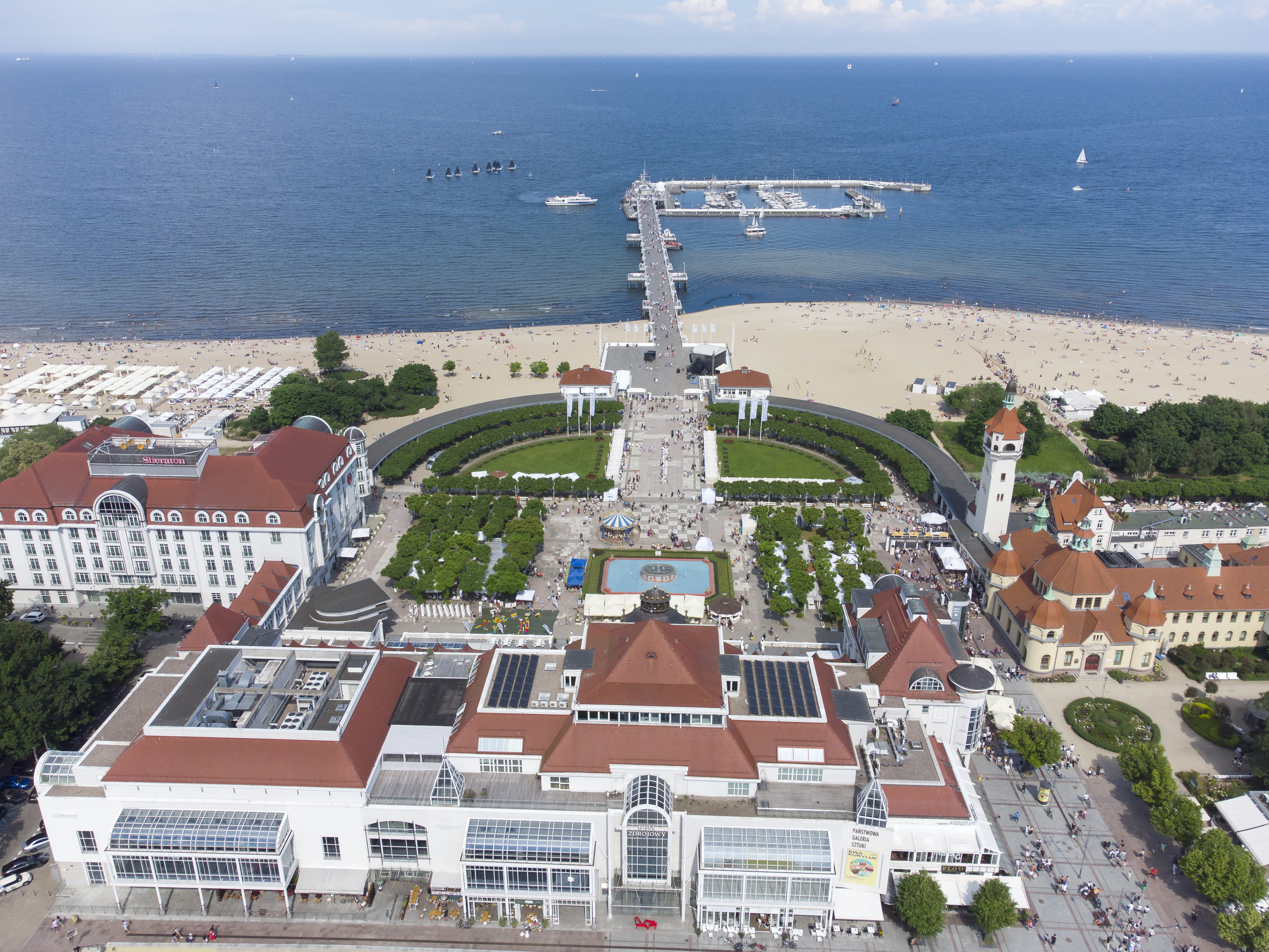
- Spa House and Sheraton Hotel (top) and Pier in Sopot (bottom)

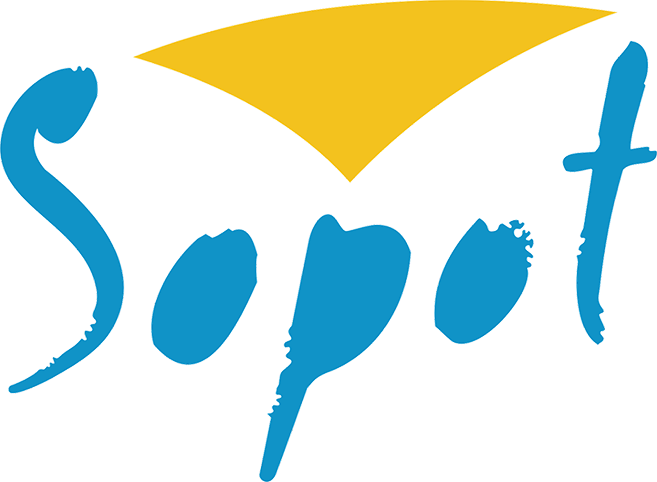
- Flag Coat of arms Brandmark
- Motto: Najmniejsze z wielkich miast (The smallest of the great cities)
- Location within Poland
- Coordinates: 54°26′N 18°33′E
- Country: Poland
- Voivodeship: Pomeranian
- County: city county
- Established: 8th century
- City rights: 1901

Government
  - City mayor: Magdalena Czarzyńska-Jachim (Ind.)

Area
  - City county: 27 km^{2} (10 sq mi)
- Highest elevation: 152.7 m (501 ft)
- Lowest elevation: 0 m (0 ft)

Population (30 June 2021)
  - City county: 35,049 ▼
  - Density: 1,300/km^{2} (3,400/sq mi)
  - Metro: 1,080,000 (Tricity)
- Time zone: UTC+1 (CET)
  - Summer (DST): UTC+2 (CEST)
- Postal code: 81-701 to 81-878
- Area code: +48 58
- Car plates: GSP
- Climate: Cfb
- Website: www.sopot.pl

Sopot (Polish: [ˈsɔpɔt]; Kashubian: Sopòt) is a seaside resort city in the Pomeranian Voivodeship on the southern coast of the Baltic Sea in northern Poland, with a population of around 30,000. It has the status of county – the smallest city in Poland to have that status. Sopot lies between the larger cities of Gdańsk to the southeast and Gdynia to the northwest. The three cities together form the Tricity metropolitan area.

Sopot is a major health-spa and resort destination. It has the longest wooden pier in Europe, at 511.5 metres, stretching out into the Bay of Gdańsk. The city is also famous for the Sopot International Song Festival, the largest such event in Europe after the Eurovision Song Contest. Among its other attractions is a fountain of bromide spring water, known as the "inhalation mushroom".

== Etymology ==
The city's name derives from an old Lechitic word, sopot, meaning "stream" or "spring". The same root occurs in a number of other Lechitic toponyms; it is probably onomatopeic, imitating the murmur (Śepot) of running water.

The name is first recorded as Sopoth in 1283 and Sopot in 1291. The Germanized form Zoppot is derived from the original Polish name. In the 19th century and in the interwar years the German name was re-Polonized as Sopoty (a plural form). "Sopot" was made the official Polish name when the town returned under Polish rule in 1945.

== History ==
=== Early history ===
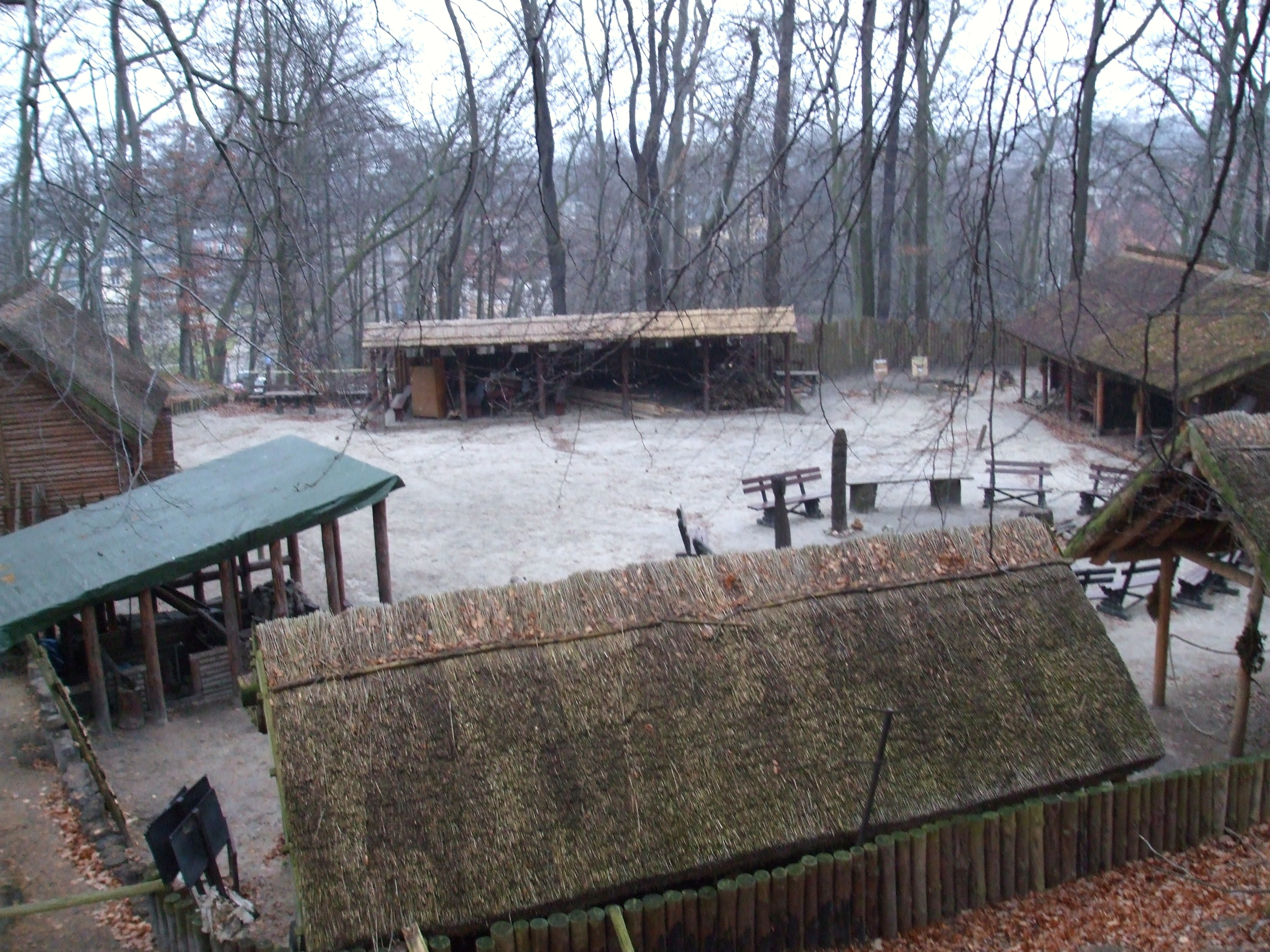
Grodzisko in Sopot

The area of today's Sopot contains the site of a 7th-century Slavonic (Pomeranian) stronghold. Initially it was a commercial trade outpost for commerce extending both up the Vistula river and to cities north across the Baltic Sea. With time the significance of the stronghold diminished and by the 10th century it was reduced to a fishing village, eventually abandoned. However, a century later the area was settled again and two villages were founded within the borders of today's city: Stawowie and Gręzowo. They were first mentioned in 1186 as being granted to the Cistercian abbey in Oliwa. Another of the villages that constitute today's Sopot, Świemirowo, was first mentioned in 1212 in a document by Mestwin I, who granted it to the Premonstratensian (Norbertine) monastery in nearby Żukowo.

The village of Sopot, which later became the namesake for the whole city, was first mentioned in 1283 when it was granted to the Cistercians. At that time it was part of Poland until the 14th-century Teutonic invasion. By 1316, the abbey had bought all villages in the area and became the owners of all the area of the city. After the Second Peace of Thorn (1466) the area was reincorporated into the Kingdom of Poland.

=== Polish-Lithuanian Commonwealth ===
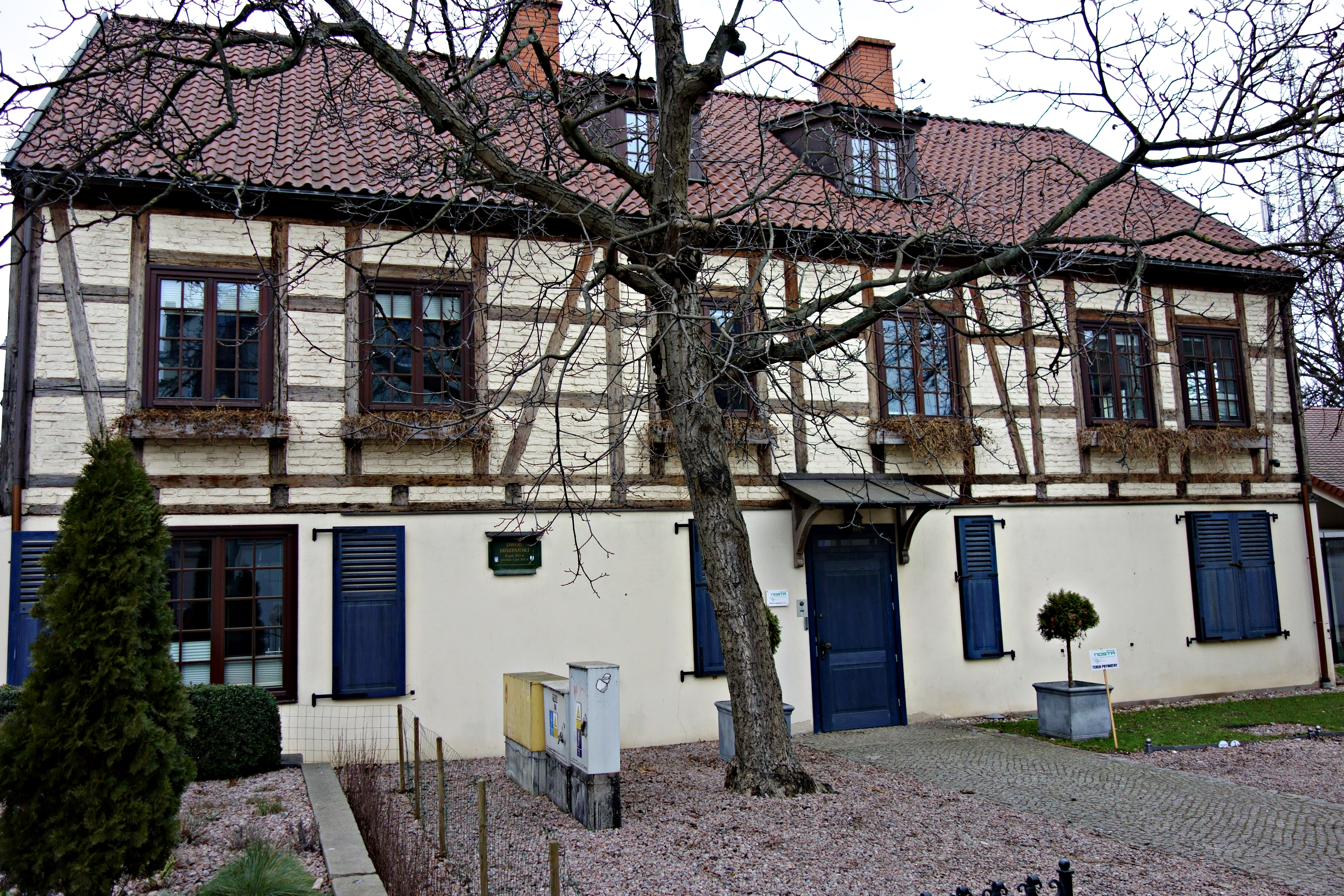
Spanish Manor (Dwór Hiszpański), one of the 18th-century manors of the Przebendowski family

The spa for the citizens of Gdańsk has been active since the 16th century. Until the end of that century most noble and magnate families from Gdańsk built their manor houses in Sopot. During the negotiations of the Treaty of Oliva King John II Casimir of Poland and his wife Queen Marie Louise Gonzaga lived in one of them, while Swedish negotiator Magnus de la Gardie resided in another — it has been known as the Swedish Manor (Dwór Szwedzki) ever since. The Swedish Manor was later the place of stay of Polish Kings Augustus II the Strong (in 1710) and Stanisław Leszczyński (in 1733).

During the 1733 War of the Polish Succession, Stanisław Leszczyński stayed in Sopot a few days before going to the nearby city of Gdańsk. Afterwards Imperial Russian troops besieged Gdańsk and a year later looted and burned the village of Sopot to the ground. Much of Sopot would remain abandoned during and in the following years after the conflict, as the patricians of Gdańsk, exhausted by the war, could not afford to rebuild the Sopot residences.

In the 1750s, Polish nobility of Pomerania began to rebuild the village. In 1757 and 1758 most of the ruined manors were bought by the magnate family of Przebendowski. General Józef Przebendowski bought nine of these palaces and in 1786 his widow, Bernardyna Przebendowska (née von Kleist), bought the remaining two. Also the Sierakowski family acquired some properties, including the destroyed Swedish Manor. After the Partitions of Poland, in the 1790s, Count Kajetan Onufry Sierakowski built the Sierakowski Mansion at the site of the Swedish Manor, a typical Polish manor house, which remains one of the most distinctive buildings of pre-spa Sopot.

=== Kingdom of Prussia ===
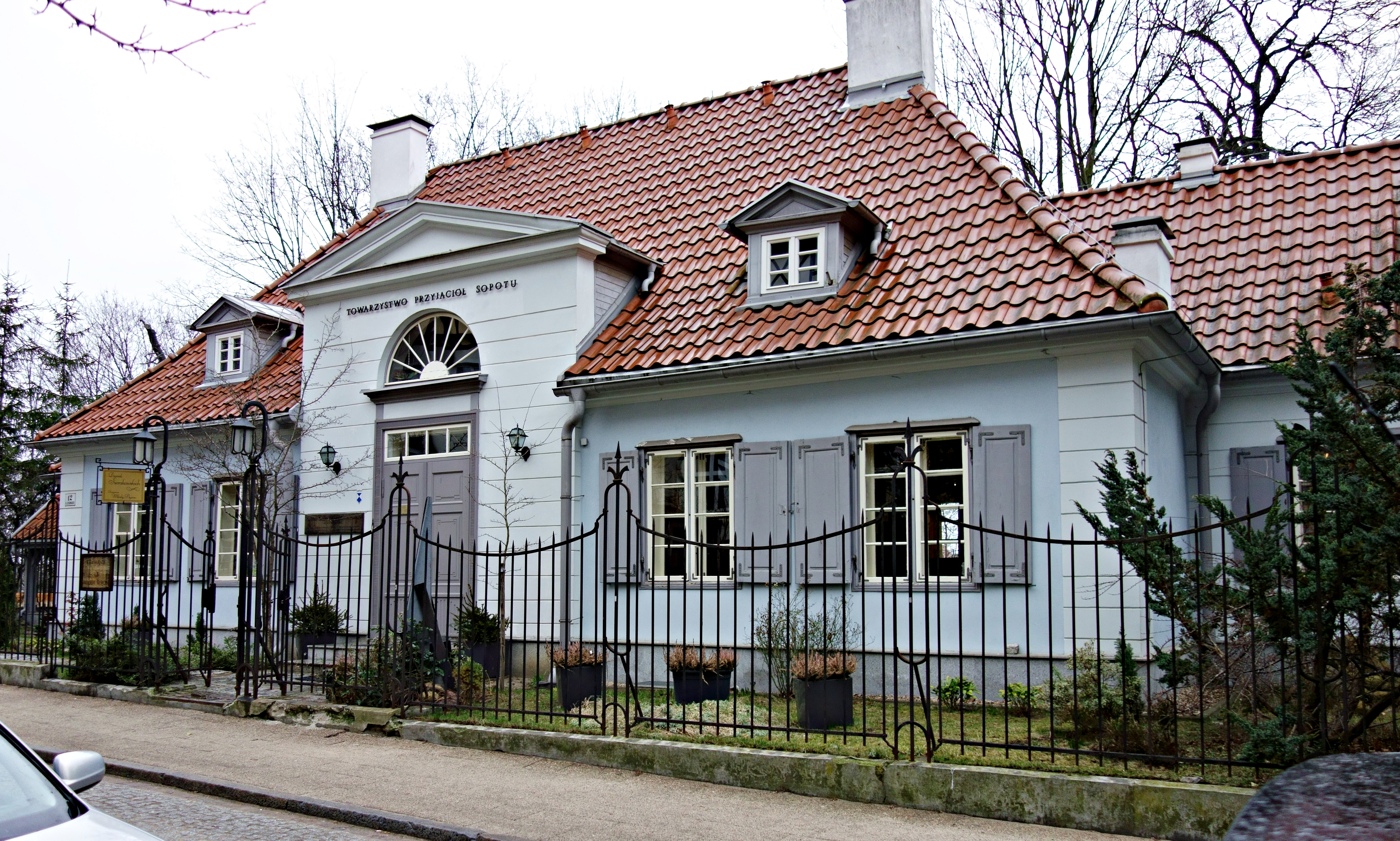
Sierakowski Mansion, a late 18th-century Polish manor house

Sopot was annexed by the Kingdom of Prussia in 1772 in the First Partition of Poland. Following the new laws imposed by King Frederick the Great, church property was confiscated by the state. The village was still being reconstructed and in 1806 the area was sold to the Danzig/Gdańsk merchant Carl Christoph Wegner. However, until 1819 it did not develop significantly, its population in 1819 was 350, compared to 301 in the year of Prussian annexation.

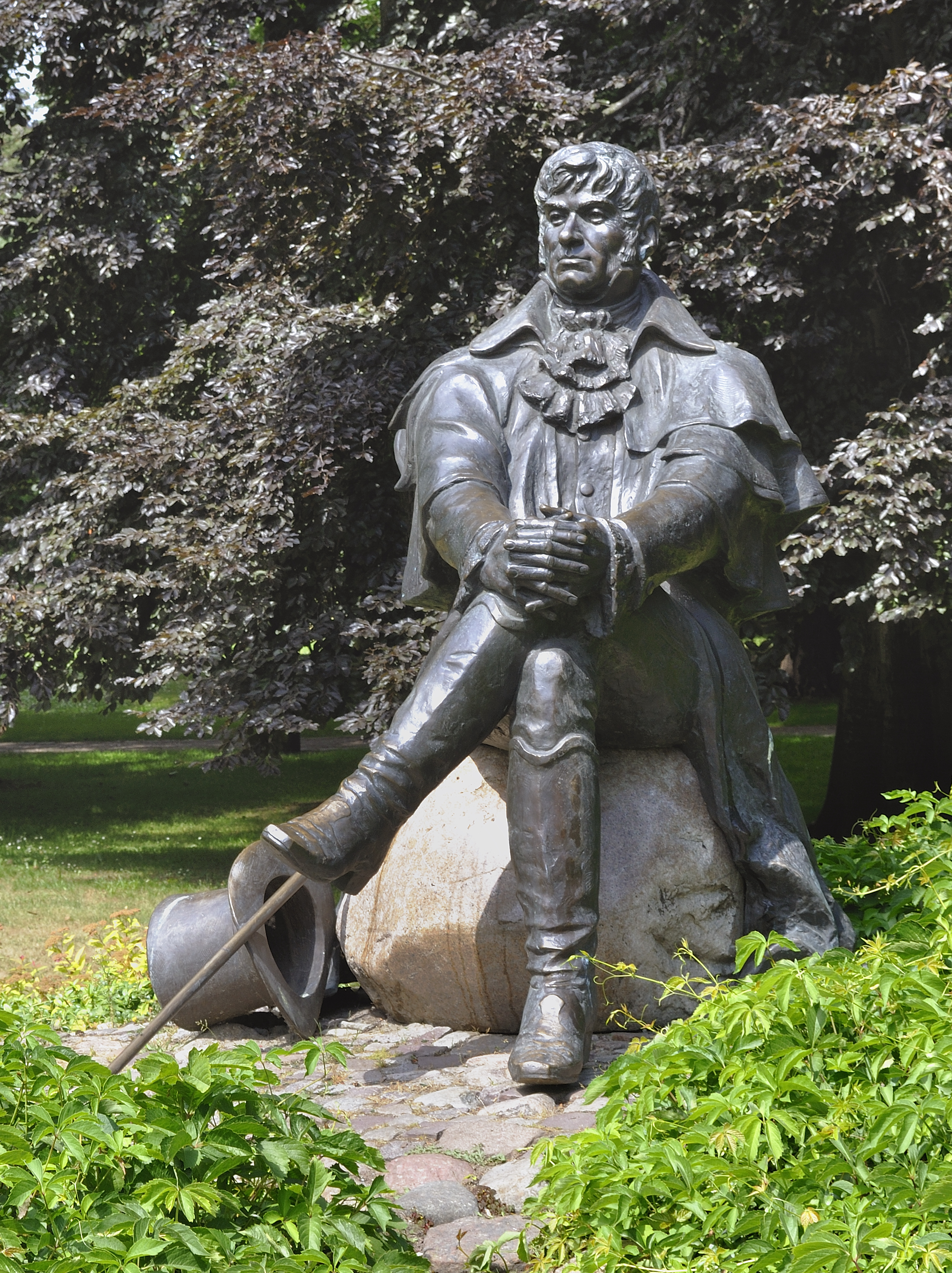
Statue of Jean Georg Haffner

In 1819, Wegner opened the first public bath in Zoppot and tried to promote the newly established spa among the inhabitants of Danzig (Gdańsk), but the undertaking was a financial failure. However, in 1823 Jean Georg Haffner, a former medic of the French army, financed a new bath complex that gained significant popularity. In the following years, Haffner erected more facilities. By 1824, a sanatorium was opened to the public, as well as a 63-metre pier, cloakrooms, and a park. Haffner died in 1830, but his enterprise was continued by his stepson, Ernst Adolf Böttcher. The latter continued to develop the area and in 1842 opened a new theatre and sanatorium. By then the number of tourists coming to Zoppot every year had risen to almost 1,200.

In 1870 Zoppot saw the opening of its first rail line: the new Danzig-Kołobrzeg (then Kolberg) rail road that was later extended to Berlin. Good rail connections added to the popularity of the area and by 1900 the number of tourists had reached almost 12,500 a year.

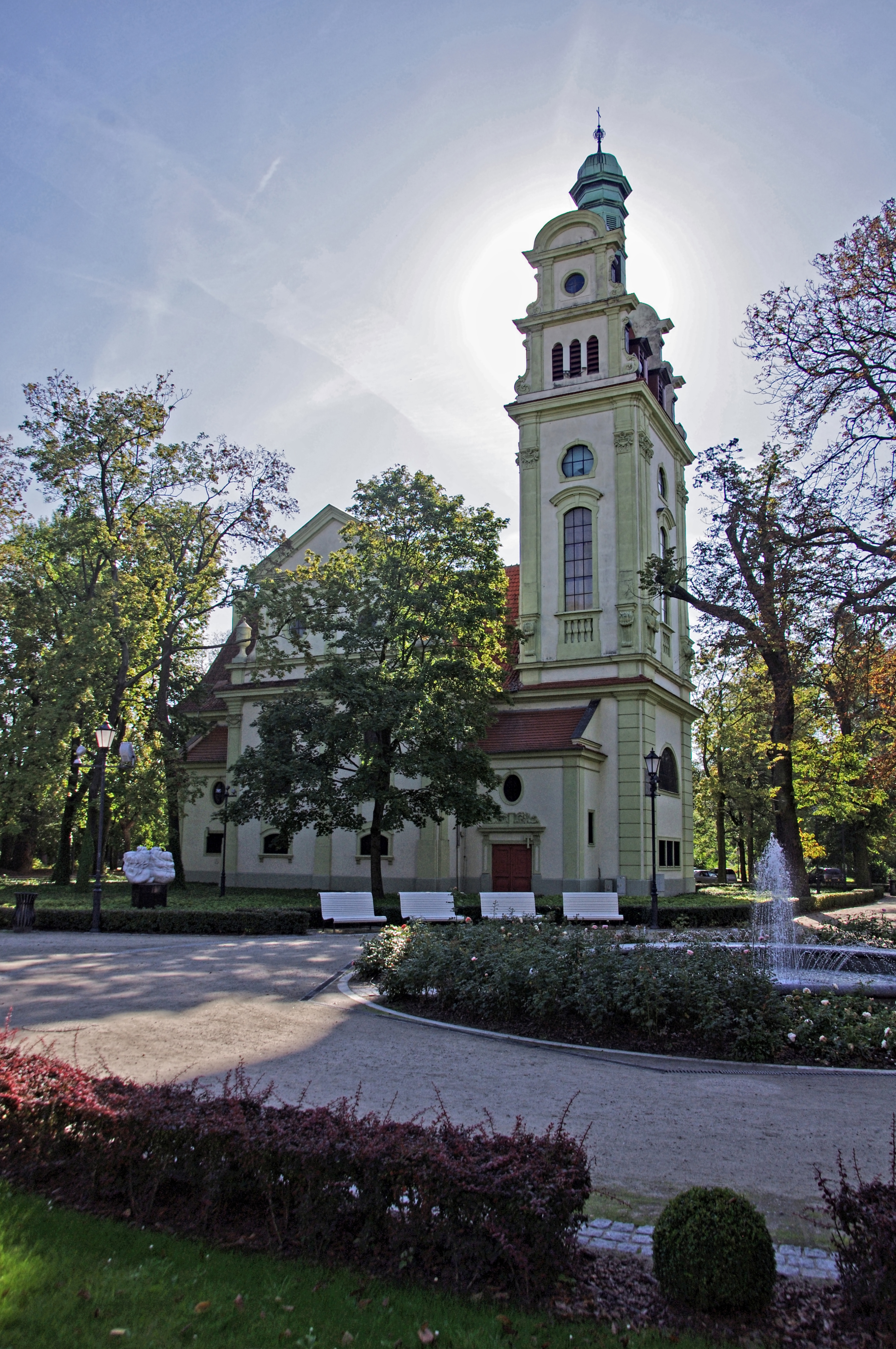
Church of the Saviour

In 1873, the village of Zoppot became an administrative centre of the Gemeinde. Soon other villages were incorporated into it and in 1874 the number of inhabitants of the village rose to over 2,800. In 1877, the self-government of the Gemeinde bought the village from the descendants of Haffner and started its further development. A second sanatorium was constructed in 1881 and the pier was extended to 85 metres. In 1885, the gas works were built. Two years later, tennis courts were built and the following year a horse-racing track was opened to the public. There were also several facilities built for the permanent inhabitants of Zoppot, not only for the tourists. Among those were two new churches: Protestant (September 17, 1901) and Catholic (December 21, 1901). From the late 19th century, there was a significant influx of German settlers with the slow growth of the Polish population, resulting in a change in ethnic proportions in favor of the former.

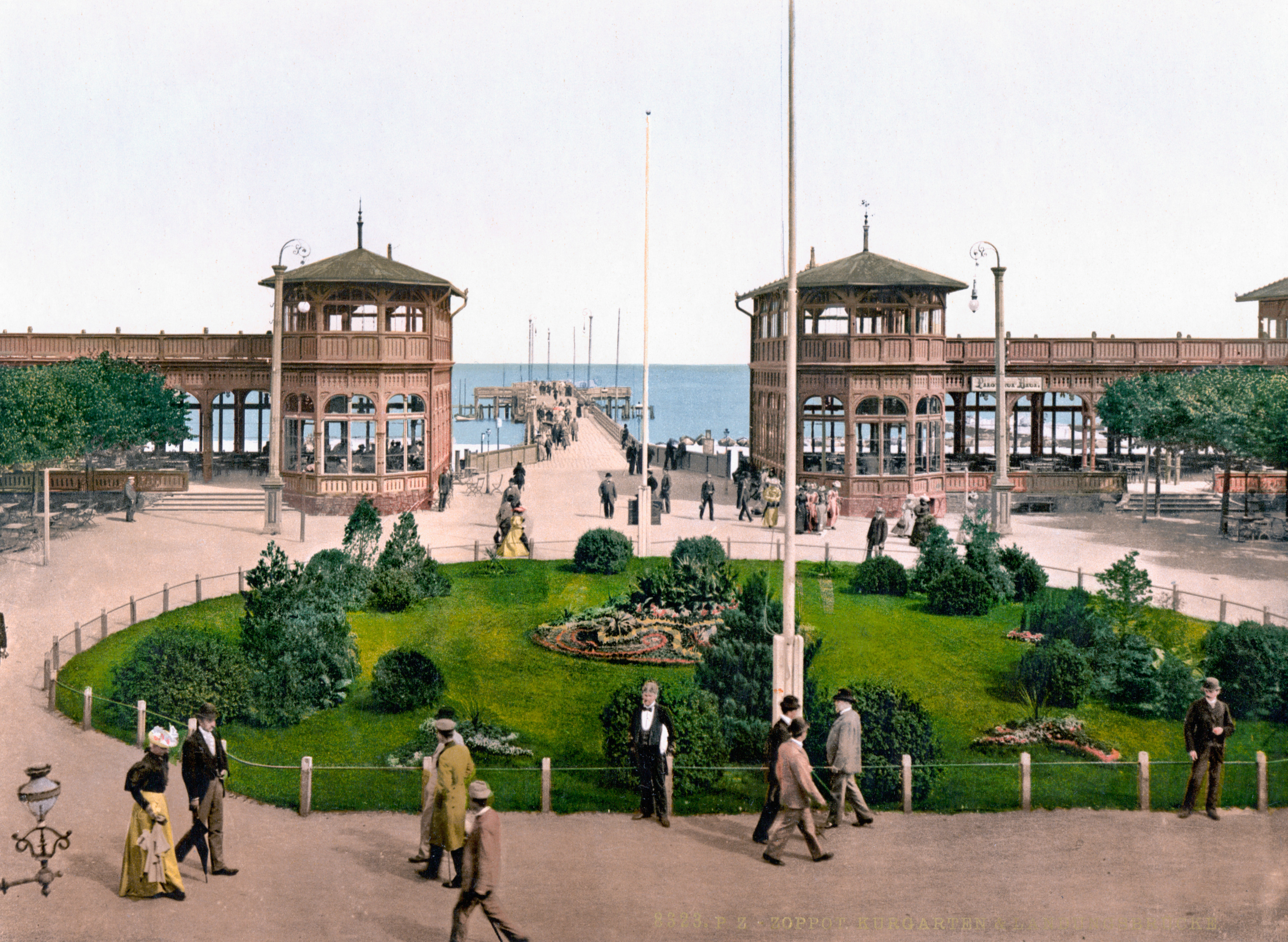
Late 19th-century view of the Sopot Pier

Since the late 19th century the city became a holiday resort for the inhabitants of nearby Danzig, as well as wealthy aristocrats from Berlin, Warsaw, and Königsberg. Poles visited the city in large numbers and the spa was very popular among the Polish intellectual elite, to the extent that the early 20th-century Polish writer Adolf Nowaczyński named it "the extension of Warsaw to the Baltic Sea". Germans and Russians also visited the city. At the beginning of the 20th century, it was a favourite spa of Emperor Wilhelm II of Germany.

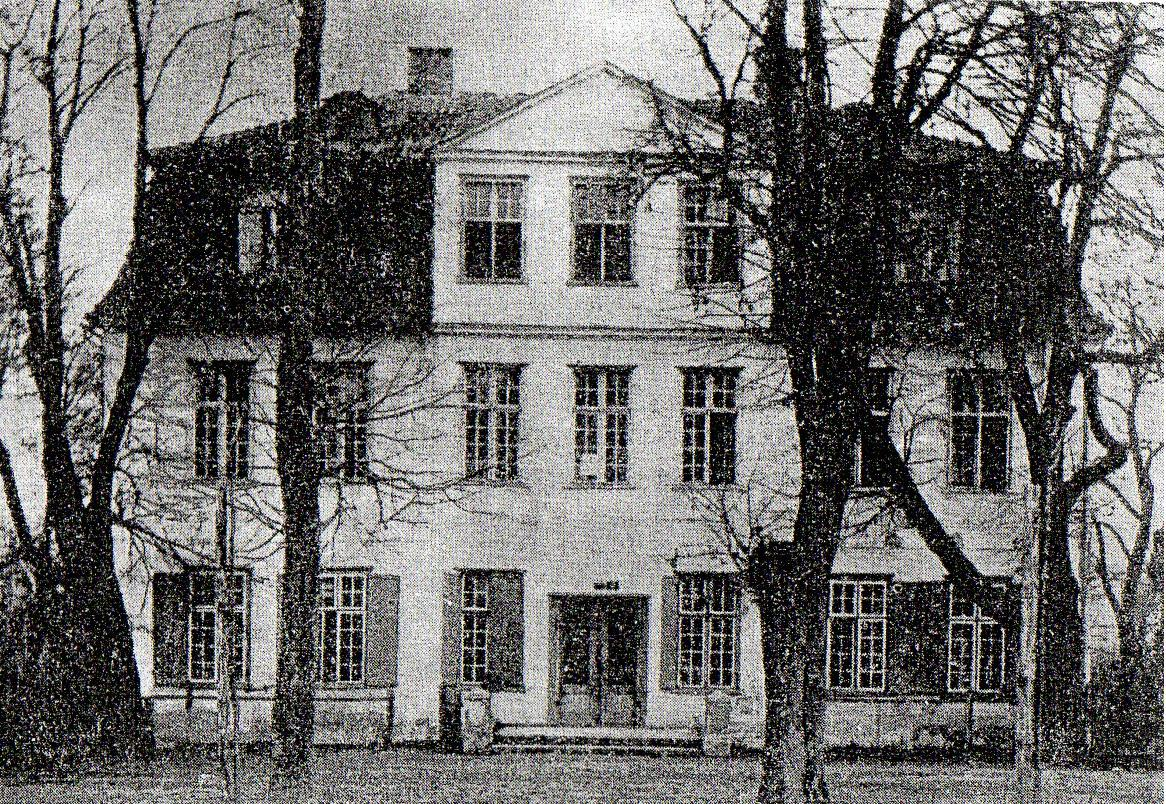
Karlikowo Manor, place of stay of King John II Casimir of Poland in 1660, before demolition by the Germans in 1910

On October 8, 1901, Wilhelm II granted Zoppot city rights, spurring further rapid growth. In 1904 a new balneological sanatorium was opened, followed in 1903 by a lighthouse. In 1907, new baths south of the old ones were built in Viking style. In 1909 a new theatre was opened in the nearby forest within the city limits, in the place where today the Sopot Festival is held every year. By 1912, a third complex of baths, sanatoria, hotels, and restaurants was opened, attracting even more tourists. Shortly before World War I the city had 17,400 permanent inhabitants and over 20,000 tourists every year.

=== Free City of Danzig ===
Following the signing of the Treaty of Versailles in 1919, Zoppot became a part of the Free City of Danzig in customs union with the re-established Polish Republic. Due to the proximity of the Polish and German borders, the economy of the town soon recovered. The new casino became one of the main sources of income of the free-city state. In 1927, the city authorities rebuilt the Kasino-Hotel, one of the most notable landmarks in Sopot today. After World War II, it was renamed as the Grand Hotel and continues to be one of the most luxurious hotels in Poland.

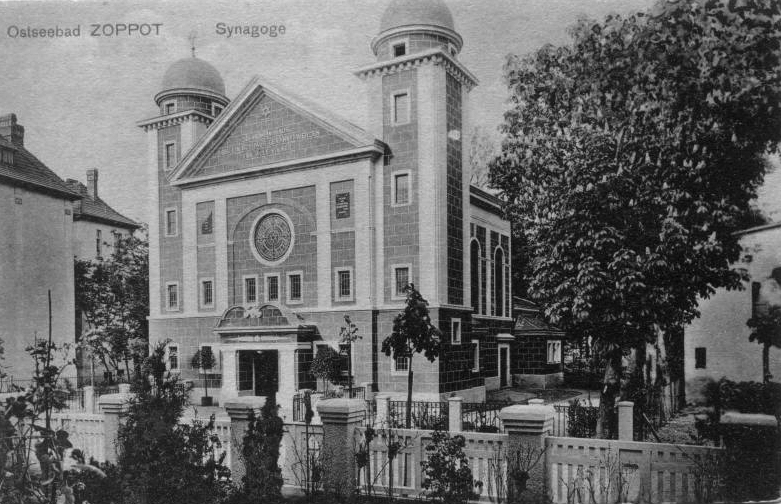
Zoppot's synagogue, built in 1914, was burned down by local German Nazis in 1938, just two days after Kristallnacht

A Richard Wagner festival was held in the nearby Forest Opera in 1922. The festival's success caused Zoppot to be sometimes referred to as the "Bayreuth of the North". As a result of the influx of Germans in the previous decades, who took over the most important functions in the city, some Poles became Germanized, however a significant indigenous Polish community was still present in the city, and there was also a Jewish community. In 1928, the pier was extended to its present length of 512 metres. Since then it has remained the longest wooden pier in Europe and one of the longest in the world. In 1928, the city was visited by 29,192 visitors, mostly Poles and in the early 1930s it reached the peak of its popularity among foreign tourists — more than 30,000 annually (this number does not include tourists from Danzig itself). However, by the 1930s, tensions on the nearby Polish-German border and the rising popularity of Nazism in Germany and also among local Germans saw a decline in foreign tourism. The Nazi Party, supported by many local Germans, took power in the city. Local Poles and Jews were discriminated against and in 1938 local German Nazis burned down Zoppot's synagogue.

=== World War II (1939–1945) ===
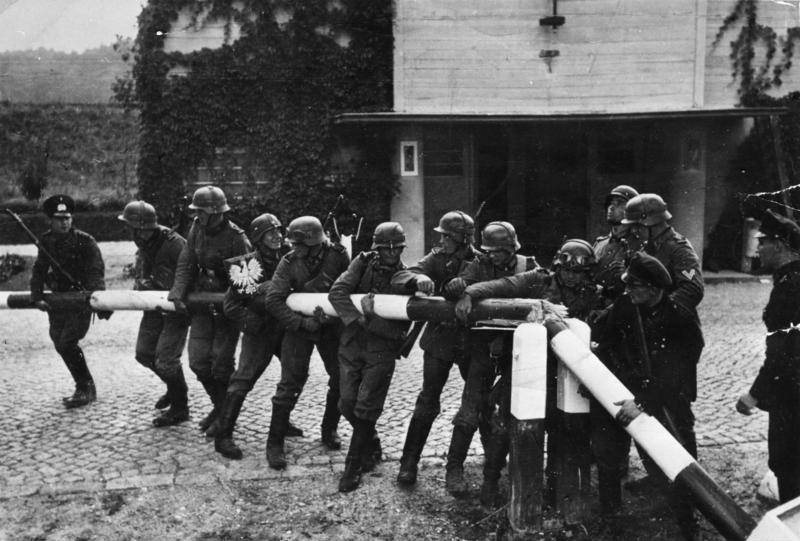
German soldiers and custom officials reenact the removal of the Polish border crossing in Sopot in September 1939 for the purposes of Nazi German propaganda

World War II broke out on September 1, 1939, after the German invasion of Poland. The following day the Free City of Danzig was annexed by Nazi Germany and most of the local Poles, Kashubians, and Jews were arrested and murdered during the Intelligenzaktion, imprisoned or expelled. Due to the war, the city's tourist industry collapsed. The last Wagner Festival was held in 1942.

The city remained under German rule until early 1945. In March the Nazis began evacuating the German population along with forced laborers. On March 23, 1945, the Soviet Army took over the city after several days of fighting, in which Zoppot lost approximately 10% of its buildings; three days later, the Soviet 70th Army reached the Gdańsk Bay coast north of the city.

As per the Potsdam Conference, Zoppot was incorporated into the post-war Polish state and its original name Sopot was restored. The authorities of Gdańsk Voivodeship were located in Sopot until the end of 1946. Most of the German inhabitants who had remained in the city (by 1 November 1945 6,000 Germans still lived in the town, after the evacuation before the advancing Soviet Army) were soon to be expelled, to make room for Polish settlers from former eastern Polish territories annexed by the Soviet Union.

=== Polish People's Republic (1945–1989) ===
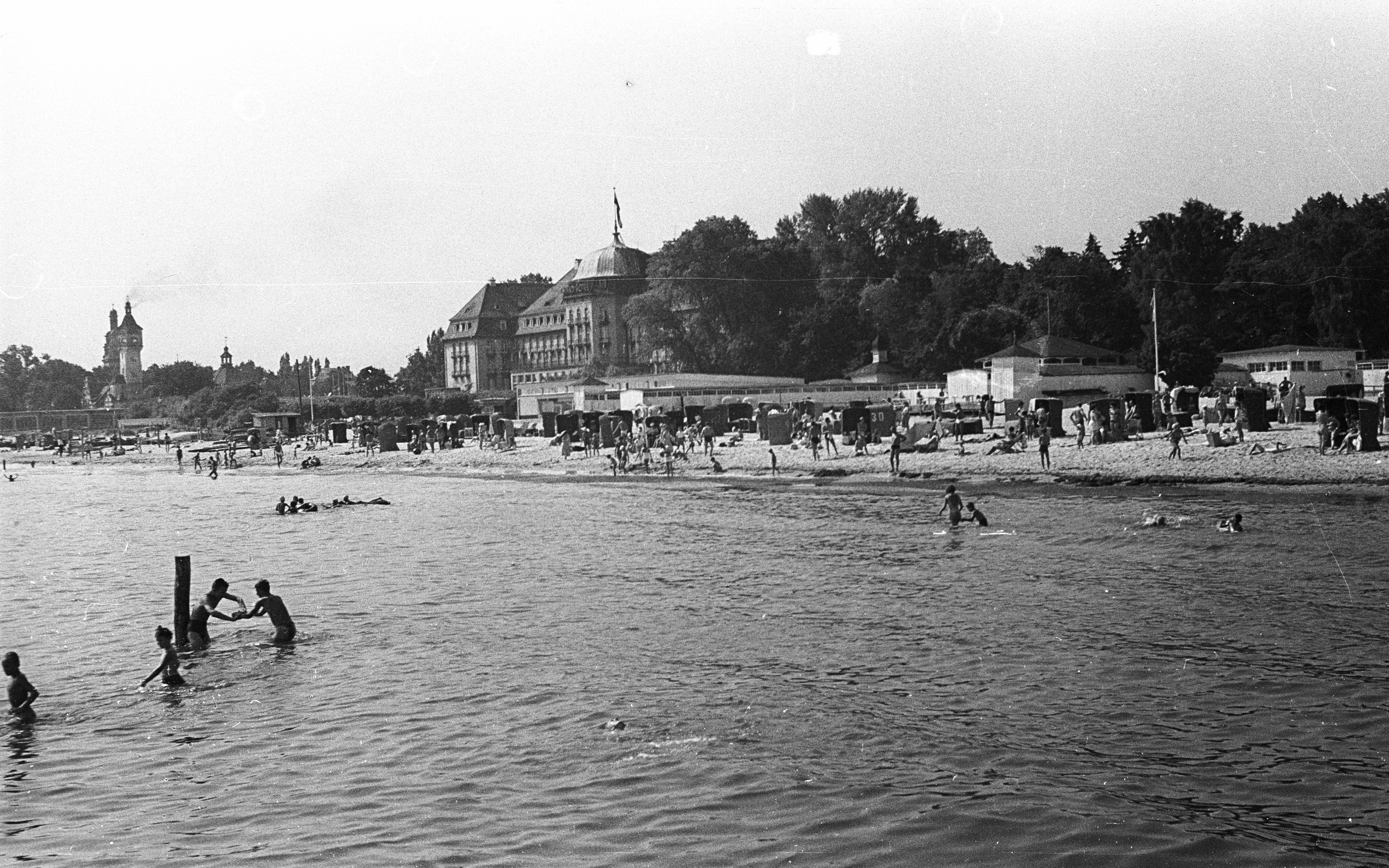
The Sopot beach in the 1950s with the Grand Hotel in the background

Sopot recovered rapidly after the war. A tramway line to Gdańsk was opened, as well as the School of Music, the School of Maritime Trade, a library, and an art gallery. During the city presidency of Jan Kapusta the town opened an annual Arts Festival in 1948. In 1952, the tramways were replaced by a heavy-rail commuter line connecting Gdańsk, Sopot, and Gdynia. Although in 1954 the School of Arts was moved to Gdańsk, Sopot remained an important centre of culture, and in 1956 the first Polish jazz festival was held there (until then jazz had been banned by the Communist authorities). This was the forerunner of the continuing annual Jazz Jamboree in Warsaw.

In 1961, the Sopot International Song Festival was inaugurated, although it was held in Gdańsk for its first three years – it moved to its permanent venue at Sopot's Forest Opera in 1964. In 1963, the main street of Sopot (Bohaterów Monte Cassino, "the Heroes of Monte Cassino") was turned into a pedestrian-only promenade.

New complexes of baths, sanatoria, and hotels were opened in 1972 and 1975. By 1977, Sopot had approximately 54,500 inhabitants, the highest ever in its history. In 1979, the historical town centre was declared a national heritage centre by the government of Poland.

=== Third Polish Republic (1989 onwards) ===
In 1995, the southern bath and sanatoria complex were extended significantly and the Saint Adalbert (in Polish Św. Wojciech) spring opened two years later, as a result in 1999 Sopot regained its official spa town status. In 1999, Pope John Paul II visited Sopot, about 800,000 pilgrims attended his mass.

In 2001, Sopot celebrated the 100th anniversary of its city charter.

Sopot is currently undergoing a period of intense development, including the building of a number of five star hotels and spa resorts on the waterfront. The main pedestrianized street, Monte Cassino, has also been extended by diverting traffic underneath it, meaning the whole street is now pedestrianized. Sopot, aside from Warsaw boasts the highest property prices in Poland.

== Population ==
Year	Population
1772	301
1819	350
1874	2834
1945	21154
1995	43576
2000	42348
2005	40075
2006	39624
2007	39154
2008	38821
2009	38460
2010	38858
2011	38584
2012	38217
2013	37903
2014	37654

== Main sights ==
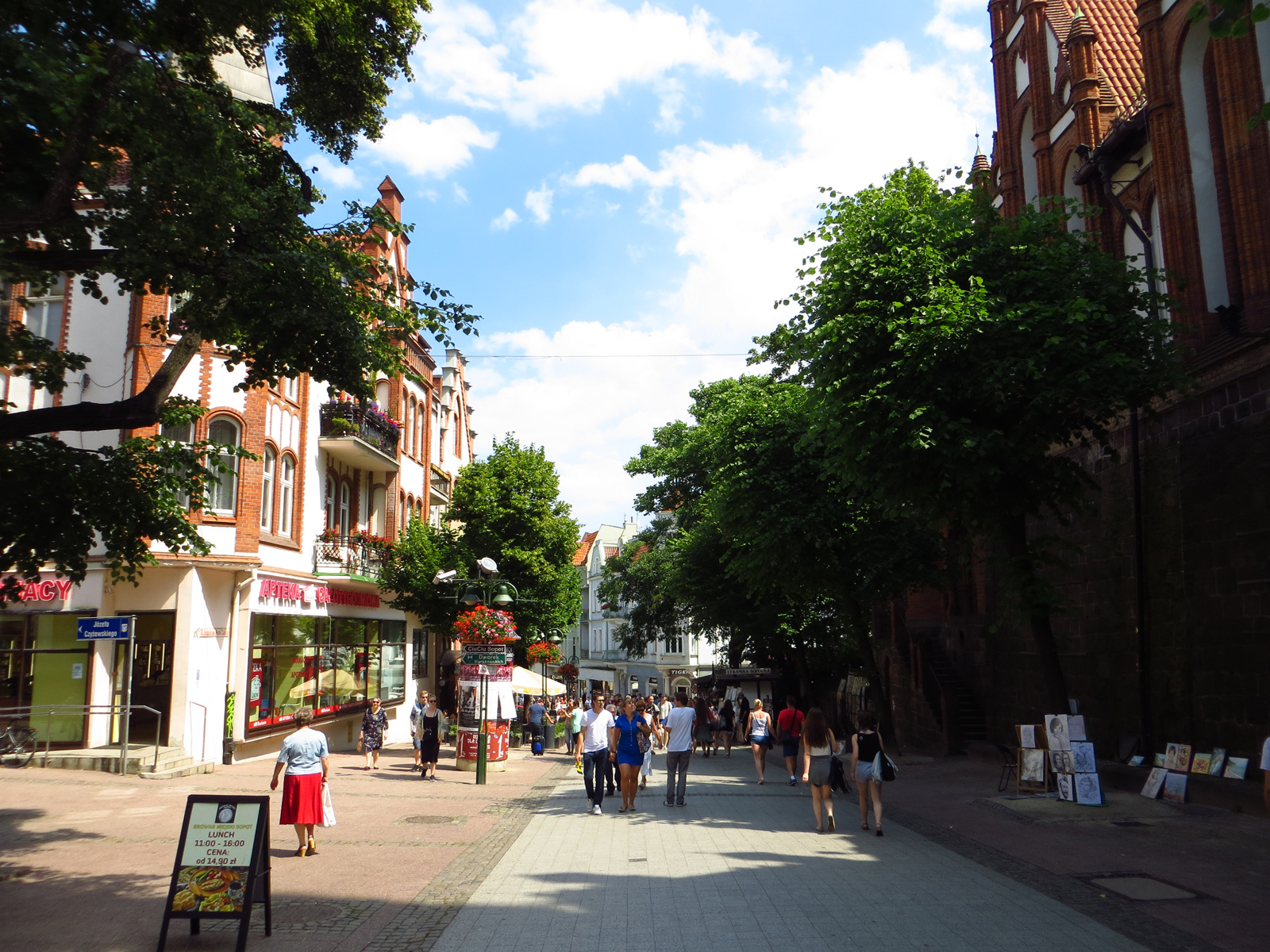
Bohaterów Monte Cassino Street, the main pedestrian zone of Sopot

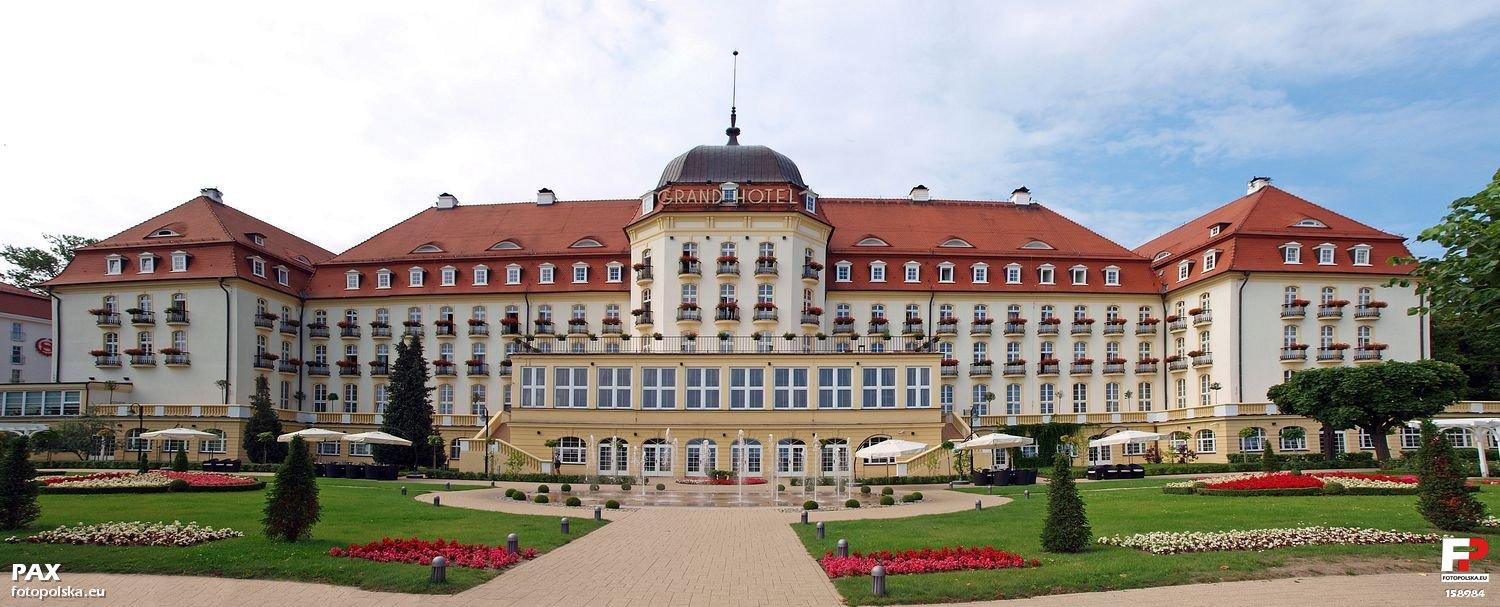
Grand Hotel, Sopot

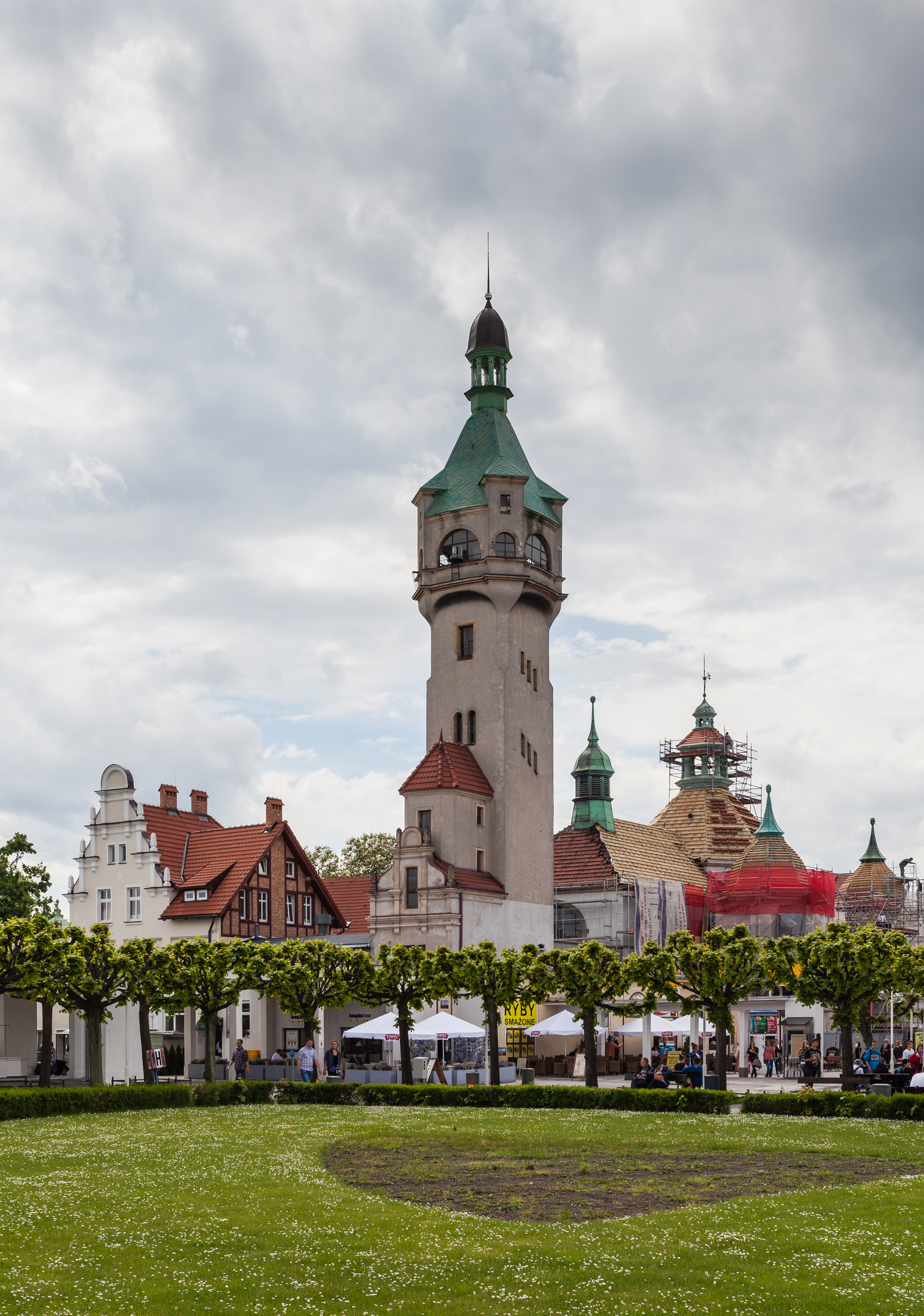
Sopot Lighthouse

Among the historic sights are:

- Bohaterów Monte Cassino Street (popular Monciak), main pedestrian zone of the city center, filled with restaurants, cafes, clubs and shops.
- Sopot Pier, the longest wooden pier in Europe, 450 metres from the edge of the shore, 650 m total
- Grand Hotel
- Balneotherapy Centre
- Sopot Lighthouse
- Grodzisko, a reconstructed early medieval Slavic stronghold
- Museum of Sopot
- Church of the Saviour
- Saint George Church and Saint Adalbert wayside shrine
- Old manor houses and villas, including the 18th-century Sierakowski Mansion and Spanish Manor, and the early 20th-century Sopot Belvedere (Sopocki Belwederek), place of stay of various Presidents and Prime Ministers of Poland during their visits to Sopot
- former Southern Baths (Łazienki Południowe)
- Sopot Hippodrome in the Karlikowo district

Other landmarks include:

- the Sopot beach
- Krzywy Domek ("Crooked House") at the Monciak
- Forest Opera
- Dom Zdrojowy ("Spa House") with the adjacent garden and the State Art Gallery (Państwowa Galeria Sztuki)
- Ergo Arena, a multi-purpose indoor arena
- Park Północny ("Northern Park") with the statue of Jean Georg Haffner
- Home Army monument, statue of Wojtek the Bear and memorial stone dedicated to Danuta Siedzikówna

== People ==
- Eugeniusz Kwiatkowski (1888–1974), statesman and economist
- Karol Maria Splett (1898–1964), a German Roman Catholic priest and Bishop of Danzig
- Anton Plenikowski (1899–1971), a German communist politician of the Free City of Danzig and East Germany
- Fritz Houtermans (1903–1966), a Dutch-Austrian-German atomic and nuclear physicist
- Klaus Kinski (1926–1991), a German actor
- Janusz Christa (1934–2008 in Sopot), a Polish author of comic books
- Winfried Glatzeder (born 1945), a German television actor and playwright
- Lech Kaczyński (1949–2010), a Polish lawyer and politician, President of Poland from 2005 to 2010
- Jarosław Kaczyński (born 1949), a Polish politician and lawyer, former Prime Minister of Poland 2006–2007
- Gustav Karl Wilhelm Hermann Karsten (1817–1908), botanist and geologist.
- Janusz Lewandowski (born 1951), politician, economist, Commissioner for Budgetary Affairs of the European Commission
- Jacek Tylicki (born 1951), a Polish artist who settled in New York City in 1982
- Jurek Jatowitt (born 1952), an Austrian judoka, competed in the 1976 Summer Olympics
- Włodzimierz Julian Korab-Karpowicz (born 1953), a Polish philosopher and political theorist
- Janusz Śniadek (born 1955), a Polish labour and political leader, Chairman of Solidarity 2002–2010
- Donald Tusk (born 1957), a Polish politician, Prime Minister of Poland 2007-2014 and 2023–present and President of the European Council 2014-2019
- Marek Biernacki (born 1959), a Polish lawyer and politician
- Janusz Pawłowski (born 1959), a retired male judoka from Poland, bronze medallist at the 1980 Summer Olympics
- Leszek Możdżer (born 1971), a Polish jazz pianist, music producer and film music composer
- Joanna Zastróżna (born 1972), a Polish photographer and filmmaker
- Wojciech Kasperski (born 1981), a Polish screenwriter, film director and producer

== Transport ==
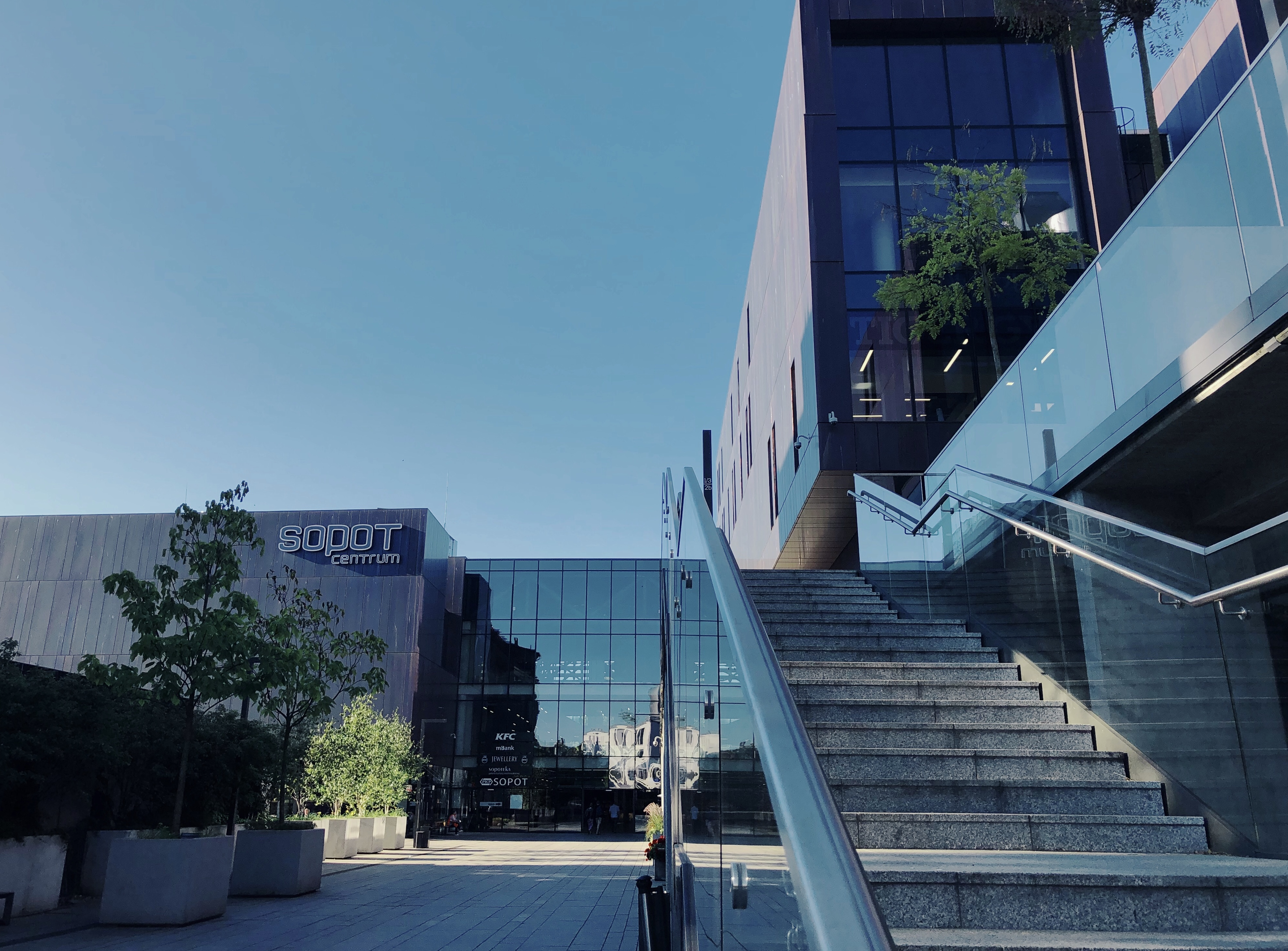
Sopot railway station

The city is covered by both the Gdynia and Gdańsk municipal bus lines, the regional commuter rail line (with three stops in the city: Sopot Wyścigi, Sopot, and Sopot Kamienny Potok), and the Polish national railway, PKP. Sopot is one of four Polish towns to have trolleybuses. The others are Lublin, Tychy and Gdynia.

== Sports ==
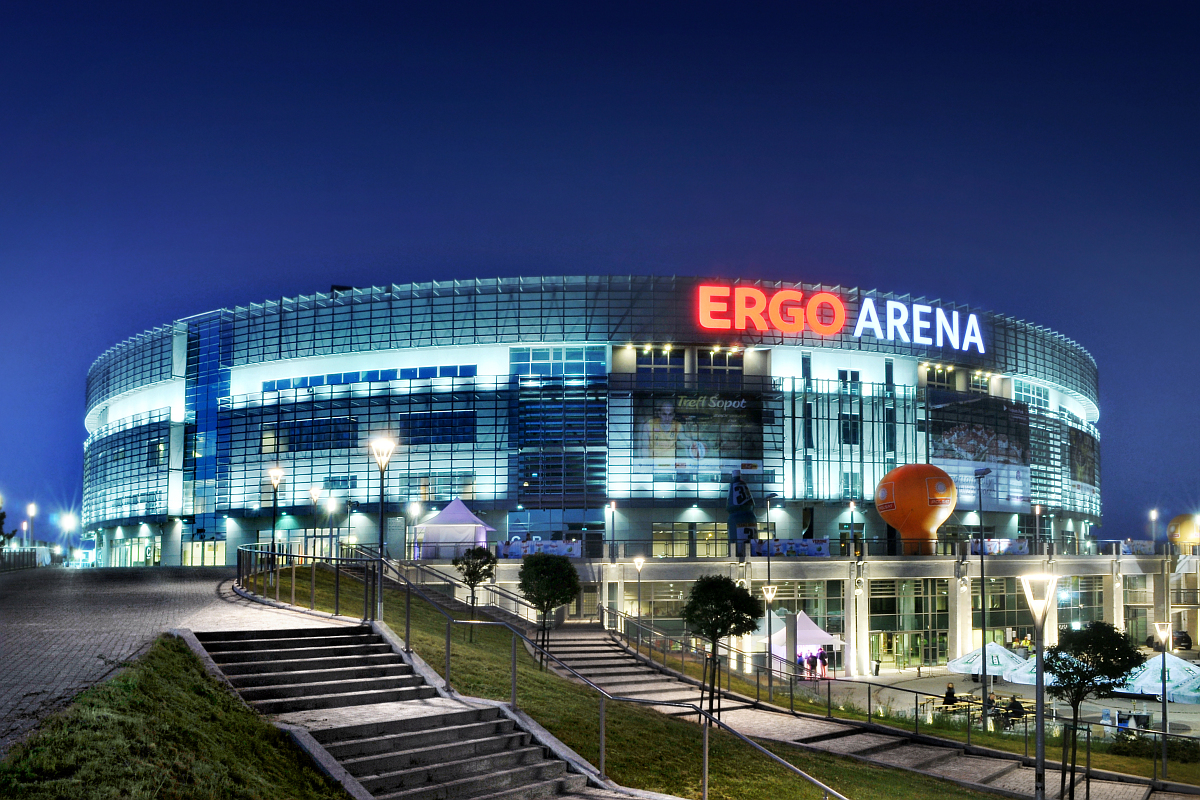
Ergo Arena is the main sports venue in Sopot

There are many popular professional sports teams in Sopot and the tri-city area. The most popular in Sopot today is probably basketball thanks to the award-winning Prokom Trefl Sopot. Amateur sports are played by thousands of Sopot citizens, as well as in schools of all levels (elementary, secondary, and university). Sopot held the IAAF World Indoor Championships in 2014.

- Prokom Trefl Sopot - men's basketball team, six times Polish Champion, who played in the Euroleague, before relocating to Gdynia, since 2009 replaced by Trefl Sopot, also playing in the Polish Basketball League.
- Idea Prokom Open - ATP and WTA tennis tournament held in August. Rafael Nadal and Flavia Pennetta won in 2004.
- Ogniwo Sopot is a rugby club, founded in 1965. Since the 80s, Ogniwo is one of the most successful Polish rugby teams. They were undefeated since 1989 to 1993, with Edward Hodura as a coach.
- PDP Ogniwo Sopot - men's football club.
- Sopot was the training base for the Republic of Ireland during the Euro 2012.

== Economy ==
Major corporations in the town include:

- STU Ergo Hestia SA
- BEST SA

== Higher education ==
- Sopot University of Applied Sciences
- Faculty Economics of University of Gdańsk and Faculty Management of University of Gdańsk
- Faculty of Psychology in Sopot, SWPS University

== International relations ==
Sopot is twinned with:

- Frankenthal, Germany
- Karlshamn, Sweden
- Lake Worth, Florida, USA
- Næstved, Denmark
- Ratzeburg, Germany
- Southend-on-Sea, United Kingdom
- Zakopane, Poland

Former twin towns:

- Peterhof, Russia
- Ashkelon, Israel

On 10 March 2022, Sopot terminated its partnership with the Russian city of Peterhof as a response to the 2022 Russian invasion of Ukraine.

In November 2025, the Sopot council voted to terminate its partnership with the city of Ashkelon, citing the Gaza genocide.

== See also ==
- Bohaterów Monte Cassino Street
- Grodzisko in Sopot
- Sports in Tricity
