= Grand Hotel, Sopot =

Hotel in Sopot, Poland

Coordinates: 54°26′51″N 18°34′06″E

Sofitel Grand Sopot
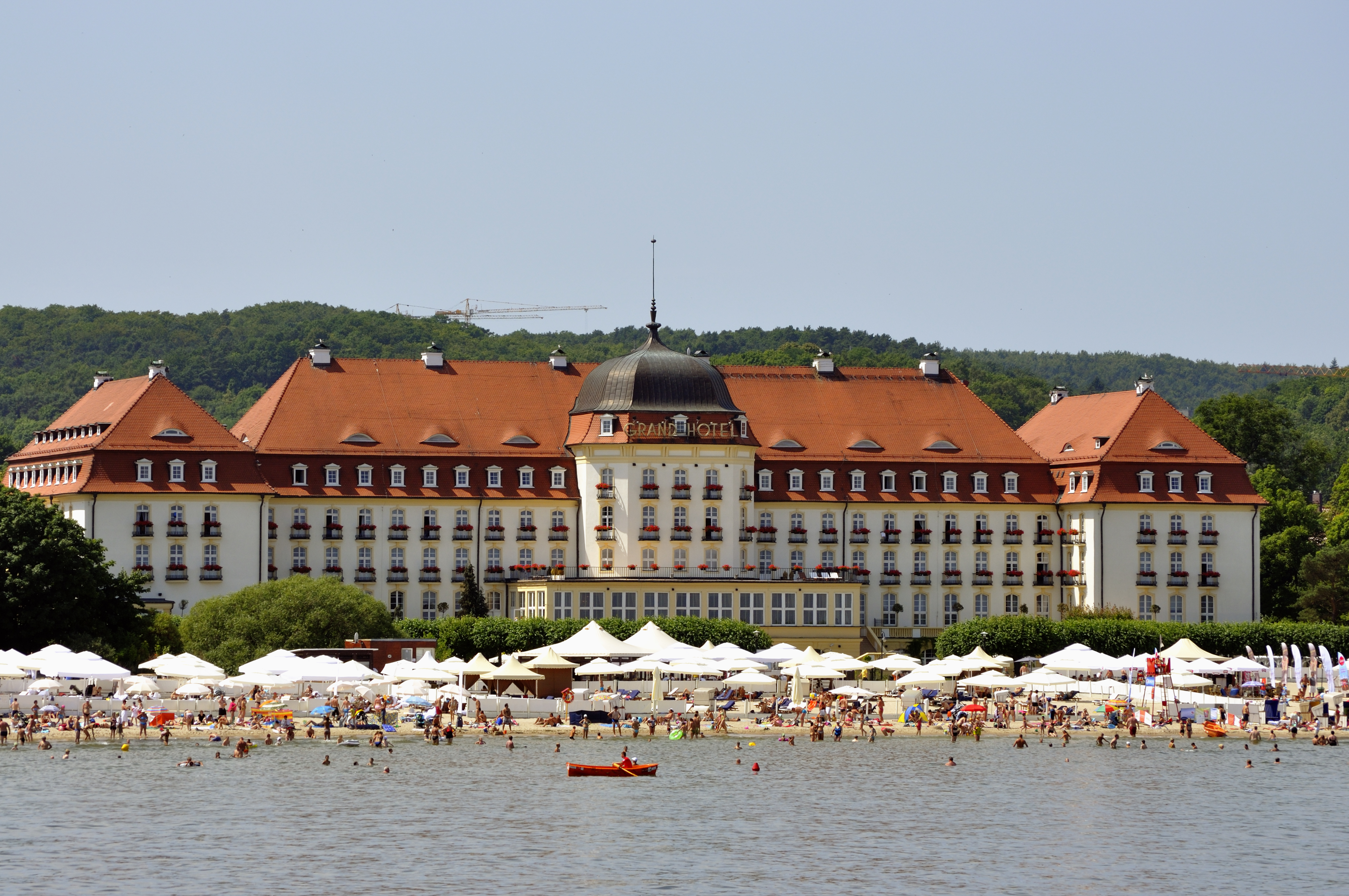
- Grand Hotel Sopot (2010)
- Interactive map of the Sofitel Grand Sopot area
- Hotel chain: Sofitel

General information
- Location: Sopot, Poland, ul. Powstańców Warszawy 12-14
- Opening: June 30, 1927
- Owner: Sinfam Investments
- Operator: Accor

Design and construction
- Architects: Otto Kloeppel, Richard Kohnke, Erich Laue

Other information
- Number of rooms: 126

Website
- www.sofitelgrandsopot.com/pl

The Sofitel Grand Sopot is a historic five-star beachfront resort hotel on Gdańsk Bay in Sopot, Pomeranian Voivodeship, Poland.

== History ==
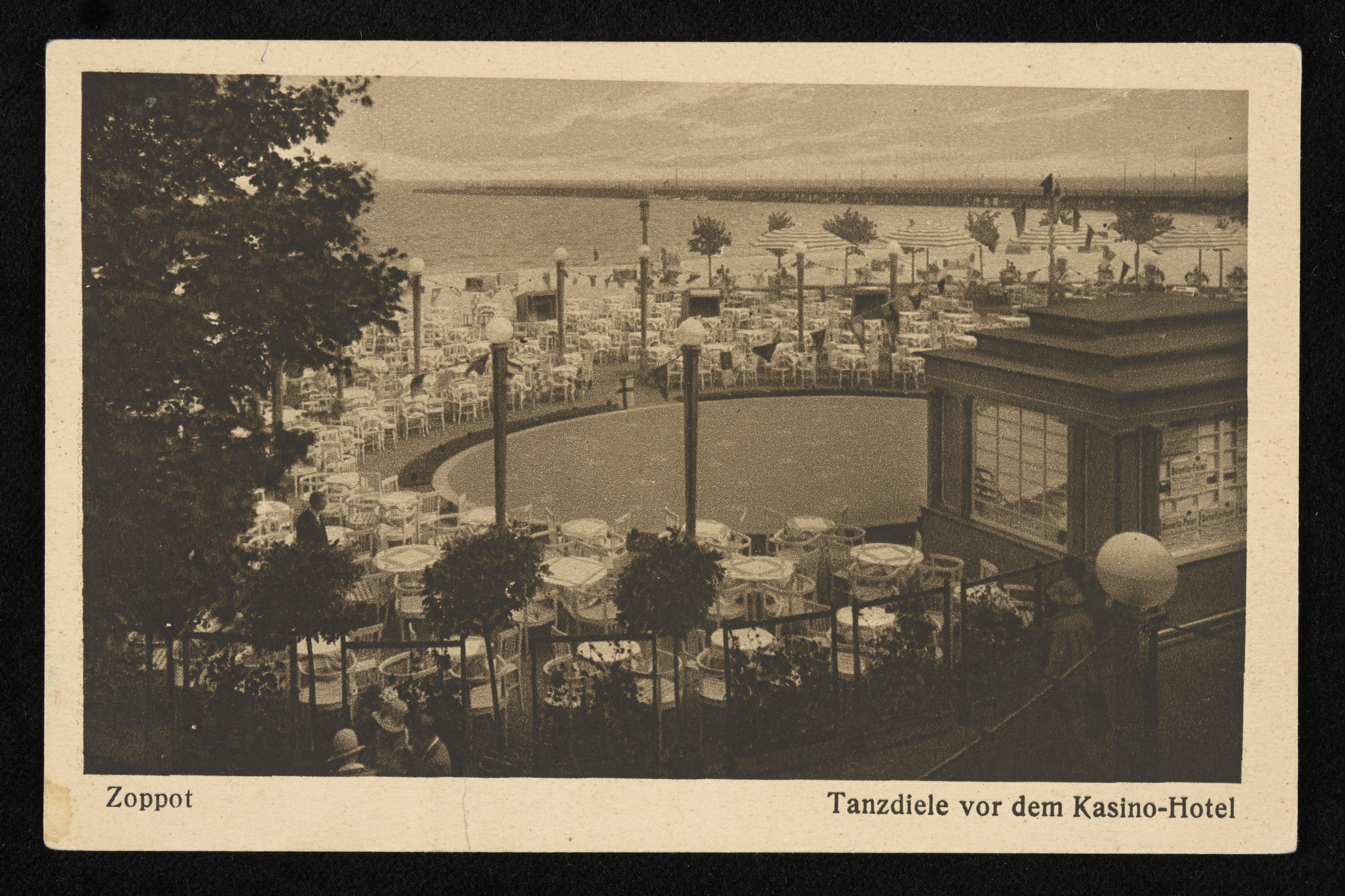
Kasino-Hotel dance terrace, 1930s

The Kasino-Hotel opened on June 30, 1927. Built at a cost of 20 million Danzig gulden, it was designed by architect Otto Kloeppel and engineer Richard Kohnke as the most luxurious hotel in Zoppot, at the time located in the Free City of Danzig.

The hotel was requisitioned by the Germany Army during the occupation in World War II. Between 19–26 September 1939, the hotel served as Adolf Hitler's headquarters, from which he went twice to the outskirts of Warsaw to oversee the invasion of the city. After the war, with Sopot now part of Poland, the hotel was renamed Grand Hotel Sopot in 1946 and placed first under the management of the Gdynia America Line and then, from 1951-1954, under the management of their state-owned successor, the Polish Ocean Lines. In 1954, Orbis, the state travel monopoly, assumed ownership and management of the hotel.

Between 11–16 September 1966, the hotel hosted the 16th Pugwash Conference entitled Disarmament and World Security, Especially in Europe.

On 13 December 1981, the hotel was the site of Operation "Mewa" (Seagull) carried out by the communist secret Security Service (SB) in which a group of Solidarity movement political dissidents was arrested including Lech Dymarski, Jacek Kuroń, Tadeusz Mazowiecki, Karol Modzelewski and Jan Rulewski.

In 1990, the hotel launched a casino, the third in Poland after Warsaw and Krakow. In 2006, the French Accor chain assumed management and the hotel was renovated, reopening as the Sofitel Grand Hotel on December 21, 2006. In 2007, the hotel opened a spa.

Orbis sold the hotel to Sinfam Investments in 2024, but Accor continues to manage the property.

== Famous guests ==
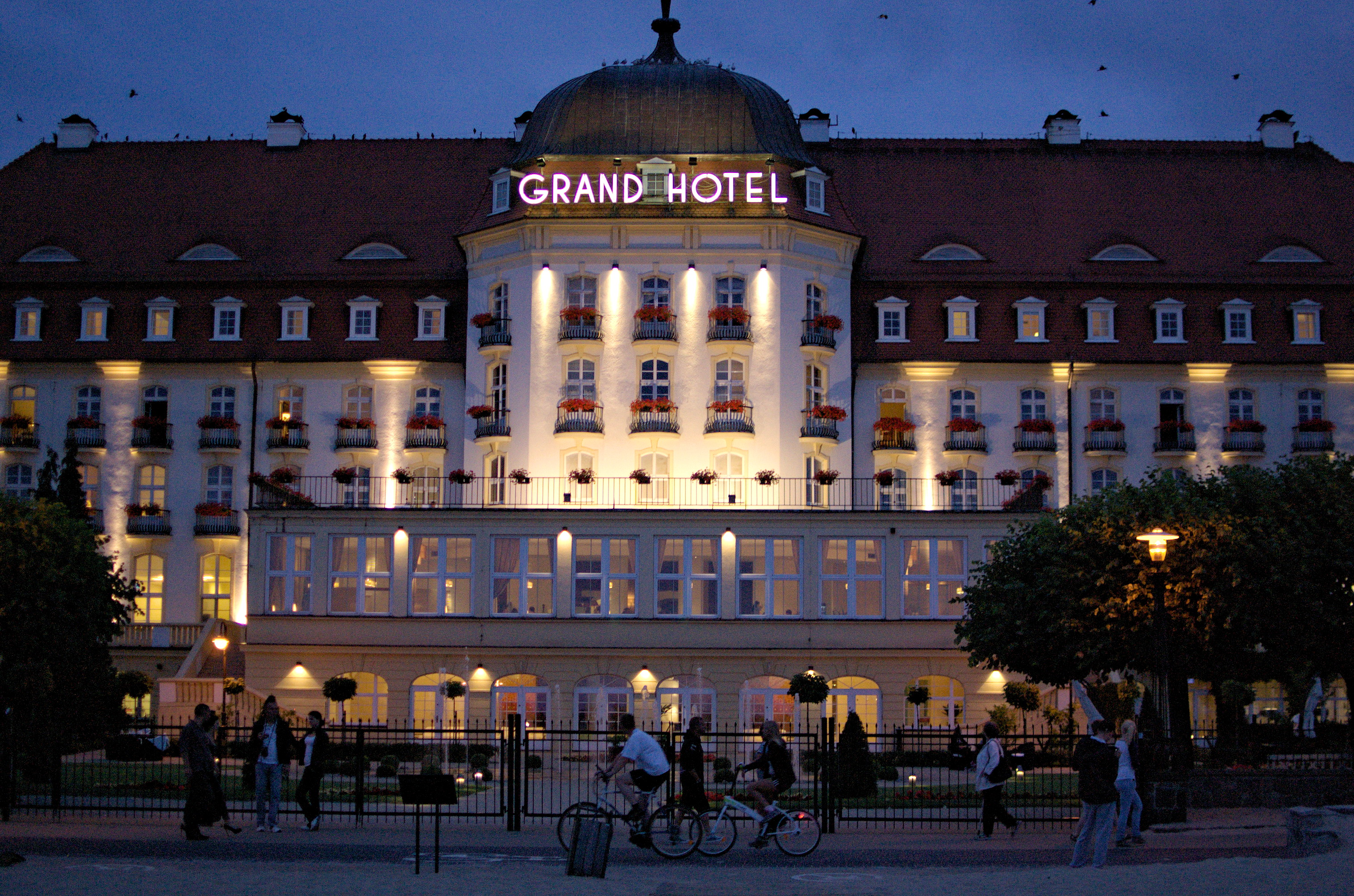
Grand Hotel Sopot at night

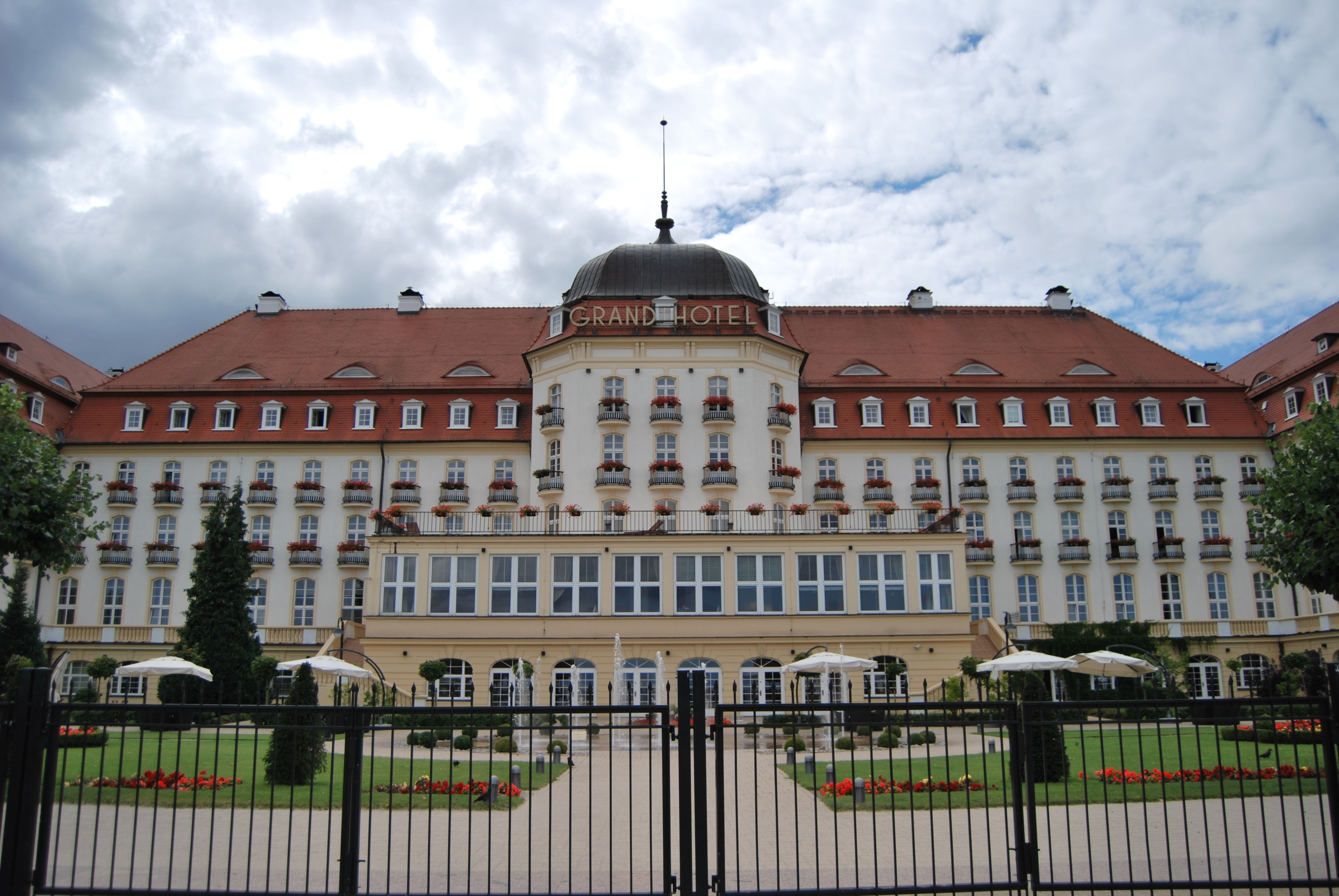
Front view

Some of the hotel's prominent guests include:

- Alfonso XIII, King of Spain
- Martin Bormann, head of the Party Chancellery (Parteikanzlei) and private secretary to Adolf Hitler
- Charles Aznavour, French singer, songwriter and actor
- Josephine Baker, American-born French entertainer, singer and dancer
- Fidel Castro, president of Cuba
- Christopher Collins, West End Man and traveller to the far east
- Marlene Dietrich, German-born actress, singer, and entertainer
- Greta Garbo, Swedish-born actress
- Charles de Gaulle, general and president of France
- Hermann Göring, a leading member of the Nazi Party, second in command of the German Third Reich, commander of the Luftwaffe
- Karel Gott, Czech singer
- Adolf Hitler, Austrian-born leader of the German Third Reich and Nazi Party
- Jan Kiepura, Polish-born singer (tenor) and actor
- Henry Kissinger, American politician and diplomat
- Annie Lennox, Scottish pop musician and vocalist
- Czesław Miłosz, Polish poet and prose writer, Nobel Prize laureate
- Ignacy Mościcki, president of Poland
- Prince, American singer
- Vladimir Putin, President of Russia
- Reza Shah Pahlavi, shah of Iran
- Leni Riefenstahl, German film director, actress and dancer
- Demis Roussos, Egypt-born Greek singer
- Shakira, Colombian singer
- Omar Sharif, Egypt-born actor
- Helena Vondráčková, Czech singer
- The Weeknd, Canadian singer
- Boney M, German pop and disco group
- Charles W. Yost, American diplomat

== See also ==
- Hotel Bristol, Warsaw
- Grand Hotel, Łódź
