= Sopot Lighthouse =

Lighthouse in Poland

Sopot Lighthouse Latarnia Morska Sopot
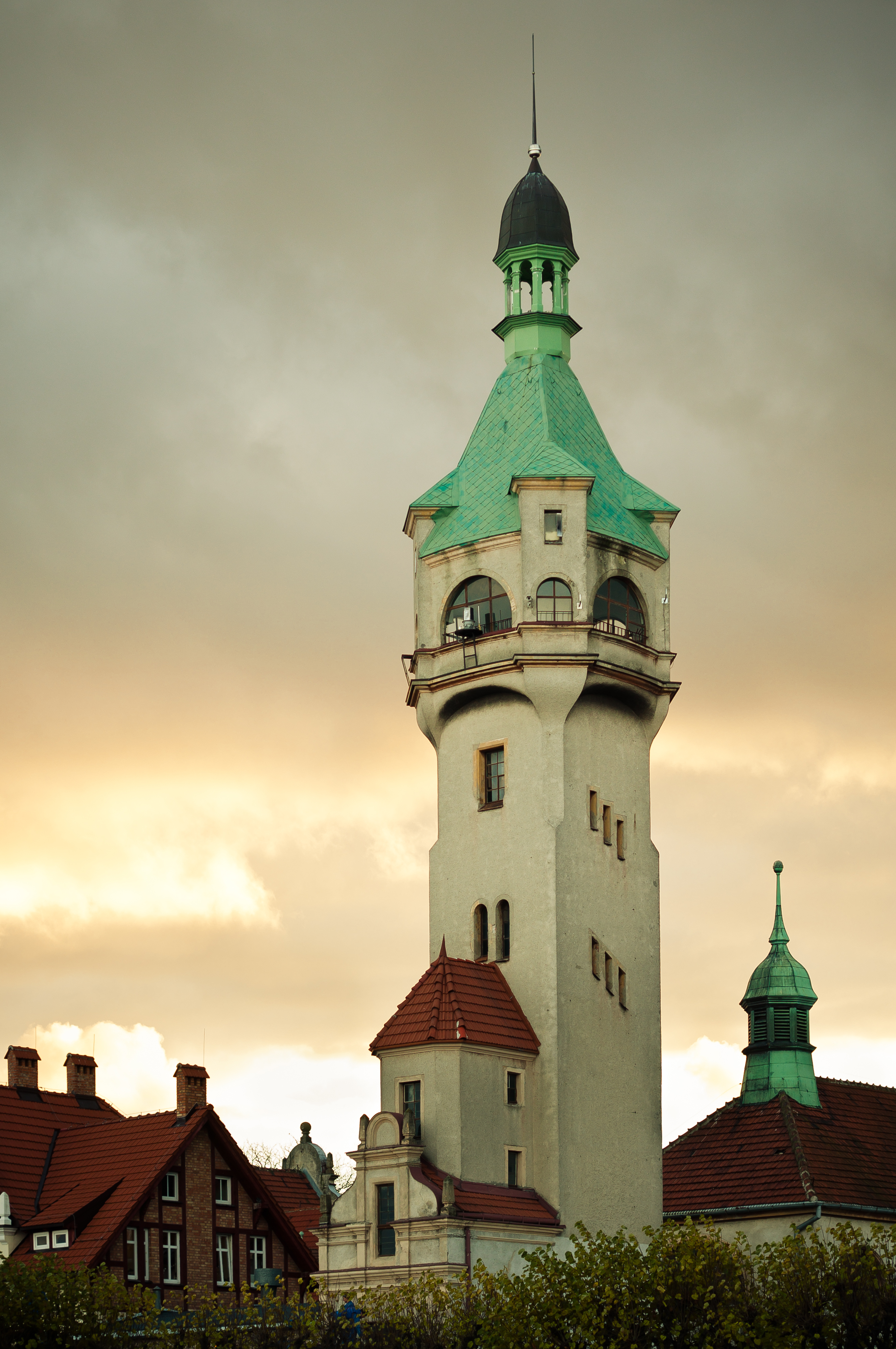
- Location: Sopot; Pomeranian Voivodeship; Poland
- Coordinates: 54°26′43.1″N 18°34′13.4″E

Tower
- Constructed: 1904 (tower)
- Construction: masonry tower
- Height: 33 metres (108 ft)
- Shape: square tower with pyramidal roof
- Markings: unpainted tower
- Power source: mains electricity

Light
- First lit: 1957 (lantern)
- Focal height: 25 metres (82 ft)
- Range: 7 nautical miles (13 km; 8 mi)
- Characteristic: Fl W 4s.

The Sopot Lighthouse is a navigation facility on the Polish Baltic coast, located in Sopot. It was built in 1903–04 as a part of the Balneological Institute. The extent of its focal length of light has since been reduced to 7 nautical miles (13 km; 8 mi), which, according to existing criteria, no longer formally makes it a lighthouse, although it is still called so. It is open to visitors.

== See also ==
- List of lighthouses in Poland
