= Bohaterów Monte Cassino Street =

Street in Sopot, Poland

Coordinates: 54°26′37″N 18°33′55″E

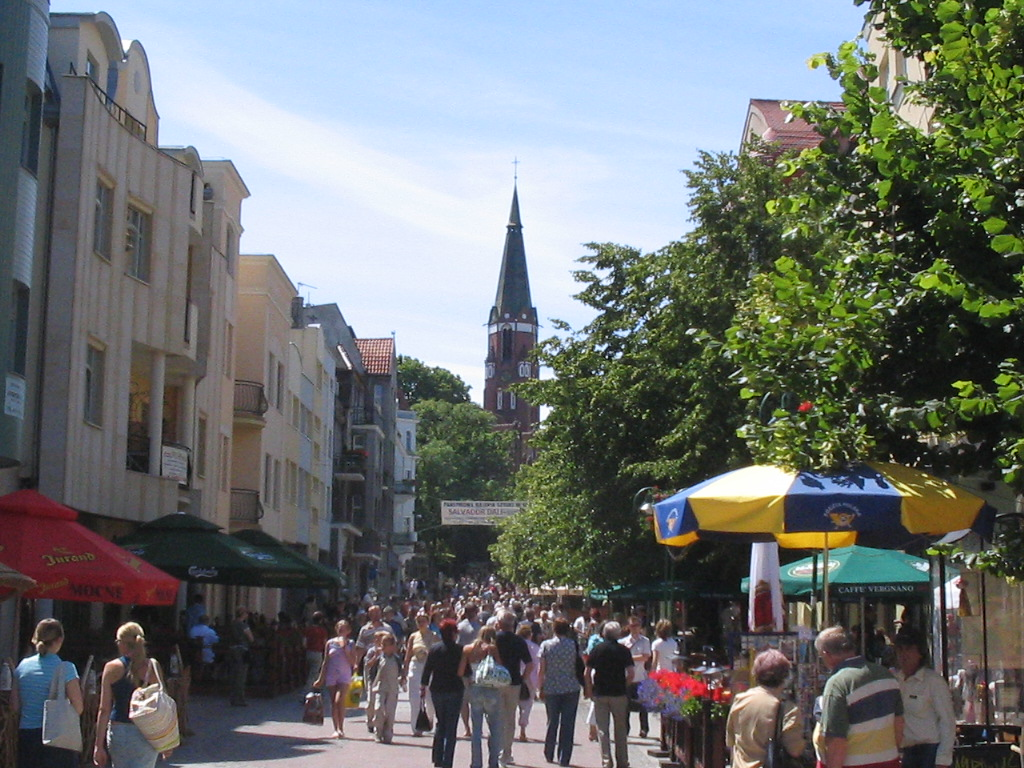
View of the street towards St. George's Church

Ulica Bohaterów Monte Cassino (lit. 'Heroes of Monte Cassino Street') is the main street of Sopot, Poland, running west to east from Aleja Niepodległości (Independence Avenue), near the railway station, to Plac Zdrojowy (Spa Square), near the seafront and pier. It is an entirely pedestrian area with no cars allowed.

Residential property surrounding the street is in a minority - there are mainly restaurants, cafes, clubs and shops. During the season it is - next to the Royal Route and the Kosciuszko Square – the most popular place visited by tourists in the Tri-City.
