= Catching Lives =

Homelessness charity in Canterbury, England

Coordinates: 51°16′27.5″N 1°4′38″E

- Founders: Joan Scrine MBE; Rev Ralph Scrine
- Type: Charity
- Registration no.: 1014868
- Location(s): Canterbury, England
- Revenue: £450,000 (2021)
- Website: Official website
- Formerly called: Canterbury Open Christmas; Canterbury Open Centre; Scrine Foundation

Catching Lives is a charity based in Canterbury, England, that assists rough sleepers, the homeless and those in insecure housing. It relies on donations, volunteers and fundraising within its local community. As of 2011, Archbishop of Canterbury Rowan Williams was patron.

Catching Lives' Open Centre provides services such as meals, showers, laundry, clothing and a postal address to its clients. The staff and volunteers work with them to address issues they may have; get access to suitable accommodation, and find the motivation to take steps towards independent living.

The charity operates a winter night shelter in conjunction with local churches. 2016–2017 was its seventh season. The project opens church halls for Canterbury rough sleepers. Volunteers transport bedding, cook meals and welcome those who stay.

== History ==
=== Name ===
Catching Lives began as Canterbury Open Christmas; before becoming Canterbury Open Centre, and then the Scrine Foundation after founders Joan Scrine MBE and her husband Rev Ralph Scrine

On 1 July 2010 the charity adopted its present name. It is a Registered Charity, number 1014868, and Limited Company number 2719436.

=== Evolution ===
The original Canterbury Open Centre provided hostel space for the homeless in Canterbury. In 2002 it absorbed the Kent Literacy Scheme; in 2004 the Canterbury Youth Project's homelessness advice service for young people, and in 2005 the Finding Your Feet scheme for asylum seekers.

The foundation piloted alcohol rehabilitation techniques for homeless people and unusually, job training. A resettlement team housed clients and assisted new tenants seeking long term homes. By 2007 it operated 146 hostel spaces and had 60 full-time staff.

In 2009, the loss of contracts worth nearly £600,000 per year from Kent County Council, who claimed quality standards were not being met, caused a funding crisis. The foundation's trustees denied the allegations but had to give all 66 staff notice of redundancy.

On 31 October 2009 the Scrine Foundation's night shelter closed after 14 years. A month later it re-opened as a day centre.

== Catching Lives Bookshop ==
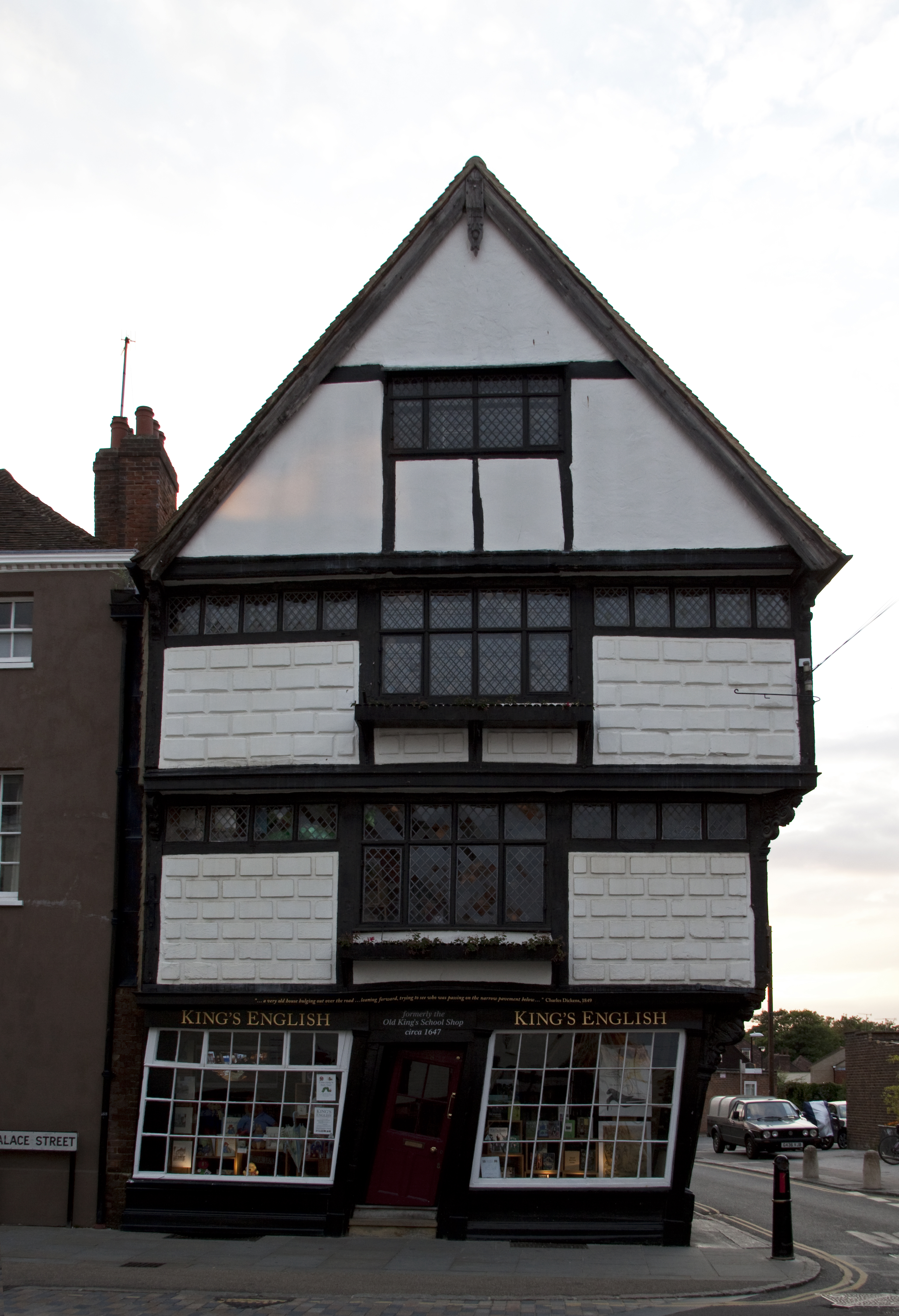
Catching Lives Bookshop, 2010

Catching Lives Bookshop is a volunteer run bookshop that helps to fund the charity. It operates from The Crooked House, also known as Sir John Boy's House or the Old Dutch House, a quirky, skewed 17th century, double jettied, half-timbered building at the end of Palace Street, opposite The Kings School. The shop is one of the most photographed buildings in Canterbury and stocks fiction and non-fiction books, as well as CDs, vinyl and DVDs.

== See also ==
- Homelessness in England
