= Crooked House of Windsor =

Commercial building in Windsor

Coordinates: 51.4823°N 0.6071°W

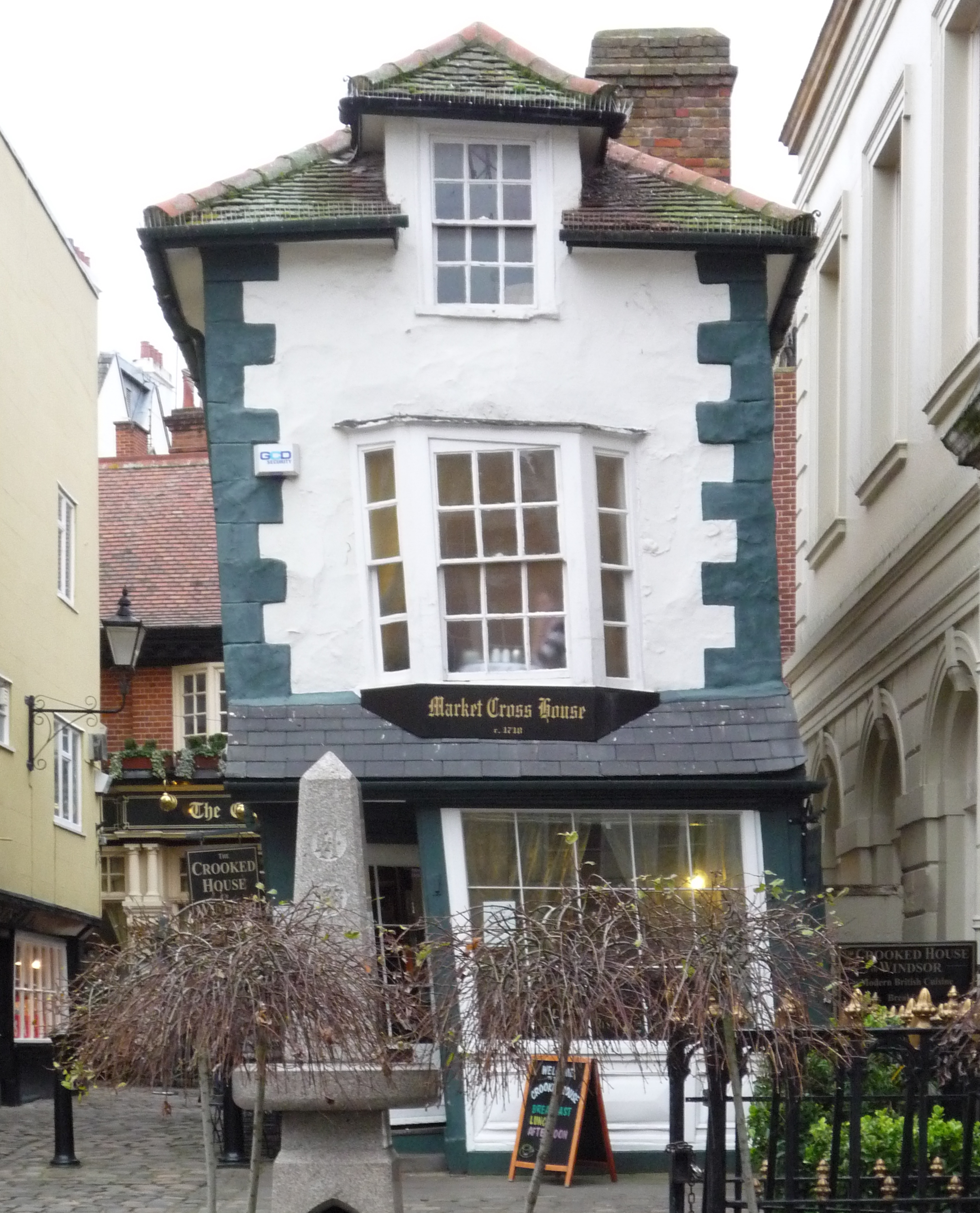
The Crooked House of Windsor

The Crooked House of Windsor (also known as the Market Cross House) is a commercial building in Windsor, England, dating from c. 1687. It is the oldest teahouse in England and Grade II listed. The building was reconstructed in the 17th century (c. 1687) and now stands on "an outrageous slant." It has three storeys and bay windows to the front and rear.
