= Gdynia-Kosakowo Airport =

Gdynia-Kosakowo Airport Port Lotniczy Gdynia-Kosakowo
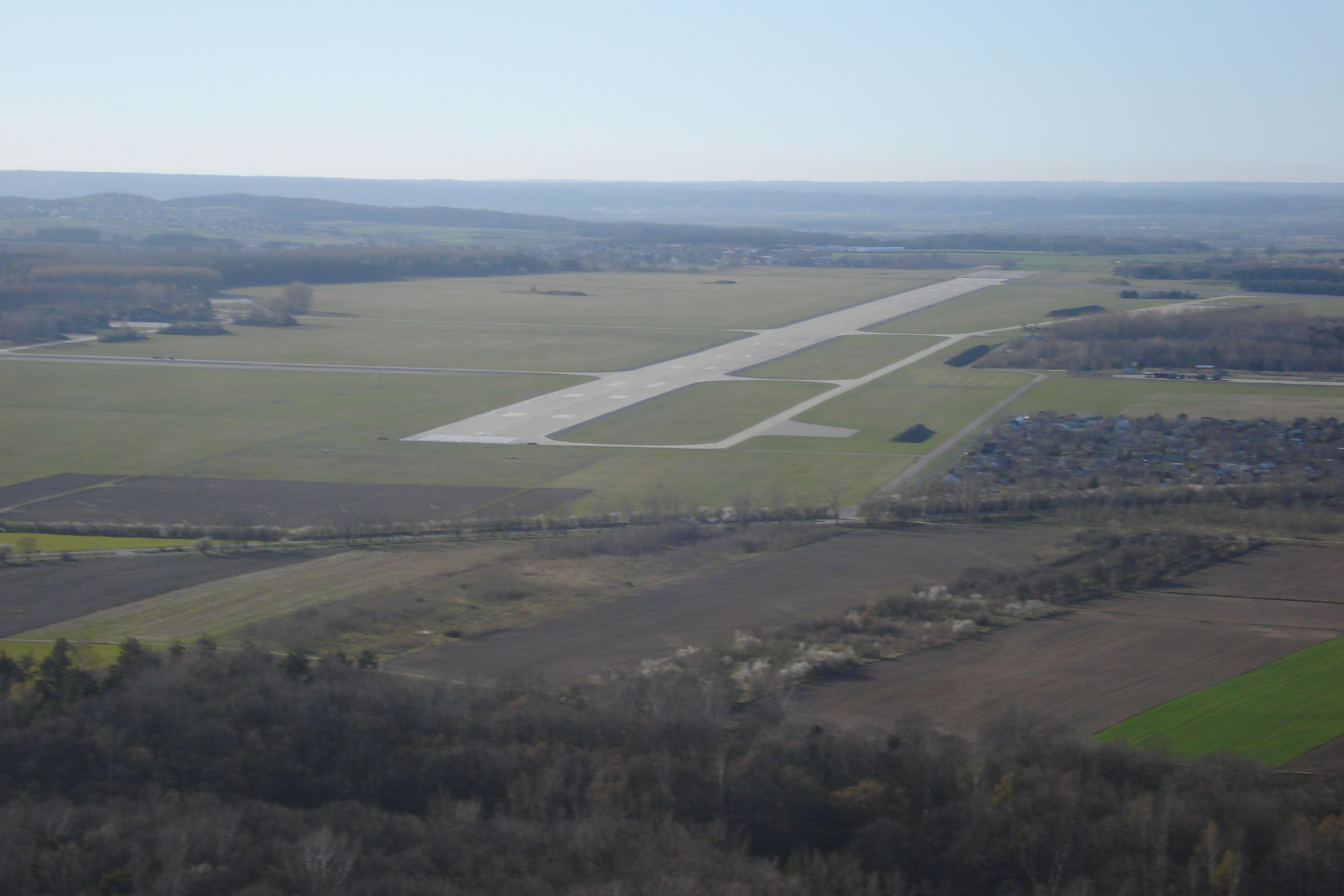
- IATA: none; ICAO: EPOK

Summary
- Airport type: Public
- Serves: Gdynia, Poland
- Elevation AMSL: 148 ft / 45 m
- Coordinates: 54°34′47″N 18°31′02″E
- Website: www.airport.gdynia.pl/

Map
- Location of airport in Poland

Runways
Direction	Length		Surface
Direction	m	ft	Surface
13/31	2,500	8,203	Concrete

Statistics (2007 +/- change from 2006)
- Passengers: 0
- Cargo (in tons): 0
- Takeoffs/Landings: 0
- Source: Polish AIP at EUROCONTROL

Gdynia-Kosakowo Airport (also known as Gdynia-Oksywie or Gdynia-Babie Doły) is a civil (unfinished) and military airport in northern Poland.

The governing authority of the city of Gdynia intended to build this airport as a low-cost alternative to the main airport at Rebiechowo, near Gdansk, providing another economic boost to the area.

== History ==
The airport was built prior to World War II on the site of the former Amalienfelde farm as a diversion airport for the Rumia-Zagórze Airport, which closed in 1974. During the German occupation, Luftwaffe planes were stationed at Babie Doły Airport, conducting tests related to torpedoes. After the war, the area was taken over by the Polish Armed Forces.

In 2006, an agreement was signed on the use of this airport for the needs of civil aviation. The managing party was to be the management of the Gdańsk Lech Wałęsa Airport. In August 2007, the local governments of Gdynia and Kosaków established the company "Gdynia-Kosakowo Airport Sp. z o.o.", whose aim is to organise the work of the airport. From 2007, construction works had been underway at the airport to adapt the infrastructure to new needs. An ILS system has been operational at the airport since November 2007.

On 6 March 2008, a summary of the report commissioned by Gdańsk Lech Wałęsa Airport by the consulting company PricewaterhouseCoopers and York Aviation concerning the "Assessment of the legitimacy and concept of taking over the role of the manager at Gdynia Kosakowo Airport" was published. This report includes m.in passenger traffic forecasts of the airport in Gdańsk (according to the pessimistic, baseline and optimistic scenarios of 3.9 million, 5.6 million and 6.4 million respectively in 2015 with a further upward trend, especially in the area of charter traffic and General Aviation) and a dynamic increase in cargo transshipments (with their expected doubling by 2015 at the latest). Attention was drawn to the legitimacy of creating an air transport cluster additionally including the airports in Gdynia-Kosakówo and Pruszcz Gdański, which would include the Tricity airports in the first phase would have the character of a duopoly, but it was noted that the current (according to data for 2007) passenger and freight traffic is not sufficient to start these investments in the coming years, and therefore it was recommended "not to involve Gdansk Airport at the current stage in development. Gdynia Kosakowo Airport mainly due to pessimistic financial forecasts and the possibility of hindering the full use of the development potential of the airport in Gdańsk". The report gives the date of profitability of the process of transferring General Aviation's traffic from the port of Gdansk to the port of Gdynia-Kosakowo around the years 2021–2025. Attention was drawn to the fact that the conflict between the two shareholders of the Port of Gdansk does not concern the legitimacy of the construction of a second port, but the timing of this investment.

On 3 September 2009, a tender was launched for the airport master plan with a capacity of 0.5 million passengers per year, and on 18 December a new air traffic control tower was put into operation.

On 18 October 2010, a tender was announced for the construction of a passenger terminal designed to handle general aviation traffic.

In 2010, the local government company Pomorska Kolej Metropolitalna was established, one of the goals of which was to connect Gdańsk Lech Wałęsa Airport, and eventually other Tricity airports, to the Tricity rail network.

In December 2010, the competition for the design of the terminal in Gdynia-Kosaków was settled, which was won by the Warsaw company ATI. At the beginning of 2012, construction works on its implementation were started by Sport Halls from Wrocław, which for PLN 20.9 million in less than a year built the GA (General Aviation) terminal: a one-storey facility with a building area of 3.9 thousand.m^{2} and a cubic capacity of 21.3 thousand.m^{3}. At the same time, the construction of a building for the airport fire brigade was carried out.

The modernisation of the apron for aircraft (expected implementation in the design and build mode) and the construction of a fuel base still remain to be implemented.

It was planned that for the first years of its existence, the airport would accept small business aircraft, cargo and charter flights. According to business assumptions, Gdynia-Kosakowo Airport was to be able to accept 1.5 million passengers a year by 2030. It was assumed that after 10 years the airport's expenses would be covered by revenues.

In September 2012. Poland notified the European Commission about the public recapitalisation by the authorities of the municipalities of Gdynia and Kosaków of the company responsible for the construction and operation of the port of Gdynia-Kosakowo with the equivalent of EUR 52 million.

Bearing in mind the emerging allegations of a potential adverse impact of the airport on traffic at the airport in Gdańsk, on 28 June 2013 the Mayor of Gdynia proposed to conclude an agreement under which Gdańsk Airport sp. z o.o. would act as the entity managing the Gdynia airport and operating on the infrastructure of the Gdynia-Kosakowo airport.

On 2 July 2013, the European Commission announced that it had opened an investigation into the financing of the construction of a civil airport in Gdynia. In particular, the EC's doubts were raised by the estimates contained in the business plan regarding the volume of air traffic and revenues in a situation where the nearby airport in Gdańsk is not overloaded (2012 – 2.9 million people with a capacity of 5 million) and offers lower airport fees than those provided for the Gdynia-Kosakowo airport. The authorities of Gdynia, in a notification to the European Commission examining the correctness of maintaining the market balance at the time of granting Gdynia Kosakowo Airport the amount of EUR 52 million in subsidies (ca ~ PLN 217 million, according to the Euro exchange rate as at 12 August 2013), provided false data on the level of passenger traffic and the capacity of the airport in Gdańsk.

On 11 February 2014, the European Commission ruled that the subsidy granted to Gdynia-Kosakowo Airport was illegal. The European Commission has concluded that the public funds transferred by the municipalities of Gdynia and Kosakowo to the Gdynia-Kosakowo airport grant the beneficiary an undue competitive advantage, in particular over the airport in Gdańsk, which is a violation of EU state aid rules – informs Marta Angrocka-Krawczyk from the European Commission Representation in Poland. In journalistic comments to this decision, it was often erroneously suggested that it concerns the need to return EU funds allegedly spent on the expansion of the airport (interpreting the amount of municipal support nominated in euros as EU support) and the fact that the airport in Gdańsk itself is also a public investment, financed by the cities of Gdańsk, Gdynia and Sopot and from the state treasury budget, as well as to a significant extent from EU funds (the argument of "undue advantage" competitive"). The European Commission conducted the proceedings at the request of the city authorities of Gdynia.

The airport's master plan prepared in 2010 contained information indicating that the actions taken by the authorities of Gdynia towards the airport in Kosaków may sooner or later meet with the European Commission's accusation of conduct incompatible with the rules of the common market. This fact was overlooked by the mayor of Gdynia, Wojciech Szczurek, in the public debate.

On 12 March 2014, the management board of Gdynia-Kosakowo Airport Sp. z o.o. filed a motion to liquidate the company.

On 7 May 2014, the District Court in Gdańsk declared the airport management company bankrupt.

On 14 January 2016, the Supreme Audit Office published a report with the results of the audit, confirming the legitimacy of the investment and stressing that "the expansion of the airport was in line with strategic objectives at the national and regional level" (the lack of such expediency was raised in the decision of the European Commission).

In 2017, the court overturned the decisions of the European Commission, but despite this, the authorities of Gdynia resigned from launching regular passenger services, being satisfied only with allowing the movement of small civil aircraft.

In 2020, the receiver of the Gdynia-Kosakowo Airport announced an unlimited tender for the sale of the airport management company, with a starting price of PLN 7.1 million[21]. The most advantageous offer worth PLN 8 million 666 thousand net was submitted by INBAP Intermodal from Biała Podlaska, however, despite the conclusion of a preliminary sales agreement on 14 January 2021, due to the failure to obtain certificates required by the aviation law, the transaction was not finalised. In the next tender, the airport was purchased by the Kosakowo municipality in order to conduct general aviation business, i.e. to operate private avionettes, gliders, parachute jumps and possibly an aviation academy for the amount of PLN 7 million 150 thousand. The notarial deed was signed on 7 May 2021, and on 14 May 2021 the airport's assets were taken over by protocol.

Since 2006, the Open'er Festival has been held at the airport.

== Airport infrastructure ==
There is a small terminal building with an open-air carpark and an unelectrified, single-track railway spur of PKP railway line number 228 some distance away that can be used for passenger service.
