= List of cities and towns in Pomeranian Voivodeship =

As of 2019, the Pomeranian Voivodeship, Poland, contained 35 towns (governed by a town mayor or burmistrz), as well as 7 cities (governed by a city mayor or prezydent miasta), including 4 cities with powiat rights.

Table by population on 2019, including two non-administrative metropolitan areas, namely the Tricity and the Little Kashubian Tricity.

Area	Population (as of 2019)	Coat of arms
POMERANIAN VOIVODESHIP TOTAL	2,186,466	
Tricity metro^{[a]}	745,603	
Little Kashubian Tricity metro^{[b]}	124,823	
CITIES (BOLD)^{[c]} AND TOWNS^{[d]}	1,473,317	
Gdańsk*	468,158	
Gdynia*	246,244	
Słupsk*	90,769	
Tczew	60,120	
Starogard Gdański	47,775	
Wejherowo	49,652	
Rumia	49,160	
Sopot*	35,827	
Chojnice	39,890	
Malbork	38,465	
Kwidzyn	38,444	
Lębork	35,333	
Kościerzyna	23,776	
Pruszcz Gdański	31,135	
Reda	26,011	
Bytów	16,918	
Ustka	15,460	
Kartuzy	14,536	
Władysławowo	9,930	
Człuchów	13,649	
Puck	11,213	
Miastko	10,439	
Sztum	9,940	
Nowy Dwór Gdański	9,905	
Czersk	9,910	
Pelplin	7,784	
Prabuty	8,695	
Gniew	6,707	
Skarszewy	6,994	
Żukowo	6,691	
Czarne	5,932	
Dzierzgoń	5,364	
Debrzno	5,096	
Brusy	5,188	
Hel	3,267	
Jastarnia	2,704	
Kępice	3,580	
Nowy Staw	4,248	
Łeba	3,644	
Skórcz	3,625	
Czarna Woda	2,786	
Krynica Morska	1,303	
^{a} Tricity=Gdańsk+Gdynia+Sopot^{b} Little Kashubian Tricity=Wejherowo+Rumia+Reda^{c} Urban gmina governed by a city mayor (prezydent miasta)^{d} Governed by a town mayor (burmistrz), either as an urban gmina or an urban locality within an urban-rural gmina * city with powiat rights Source
