= Piotr Nisztor =

Polish investigative journalist and reporter

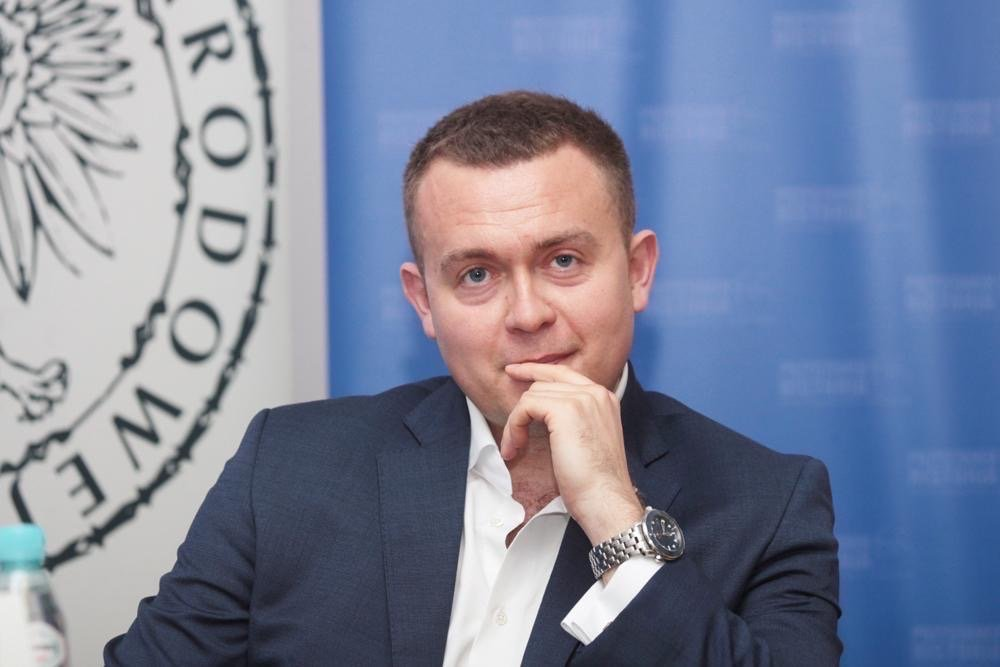
- Piotr Nisztor in May 2019
- Born: 1984 (age 41–42)
- Education: Cardinal Stefan Wyszyński University
- Occupations: Investigative journalist; reporter
- Years active: 2007–present
- Employer(s): Gazeta Polska, Telewizja Republika
- Known for: Investigative reporting on political scandals

Piotr Nisztor (born 1984) is a Polish investigative journalist, former editor-in-chief of the weekly 7 Dni Puls Tygodnia.

== Career ==
Piotr Nisztor was born in 1984. In 2008, he graduated from the Institute of Media Education and Journalism at Cardinal Stefan Wyszyński University in Warsaw. His master's thesis examined the history of the Military Gendarmerie and the evolution of its ethical norms.

He collaborated with the Polish weeklies such as "Nowe Mazowsze," "Niedziela," and the sports magazine "Tylko Piłka." He also published in the dailies "Życie" and "Życie Warszawy." He also worked for "Gazeta Polska" and "Dziennik." From the end of 2007 to January 2012 he was a journalist at "Rzeczpospolita." In July 2008, together with Izabela Kacprzak and Piotr Kubiak, he published in the newspaper an article disclosing a recording of a conversation that was said to provide evidence that the Mayor of Sopot, Jacek Karnowski, had offered a bribe to a businessman. For this publication he was nominated for the MediaTory award, awarded by journalism students from all over Poland. From September to November 2009, he hosted the investigative magazine "Na tropie" (On the trail) broadcast on TVP1.

He also described the circumstances of the transfer from Iraq and hiding in Poland of an Iraqi scientist who worked on secret projects related to weapons of mass destruction. He has written reports from Algeria and the Transnistrian Republic.

He later published in the national economic and business daily "Puls Biznesu", and from September 2013 to January 2014 he was the editor-in-chief of the weekly with press reprints "7 Dni Puls Tygodnia". Until the end of 2014, he collaborated with the weekly "Wprost," providing it with transcripts of wiretapped conversations with politicians and high-ranking officials. In June 2014, the magazine published the first article on the tapes, with Nisztor, among others, signing the so-called wiretapping scandal. For this publication he received the Polish Grand Press award in the news category and a nomination for the Andrzej Woyciechowski Award.

He was previously nominated twice for the Grand Press award in the news category – in 2008 for a text about the cancellation by Deputy Prime Minister Waldemar Pawlak of the financial penalty imposed on the fuel company J&S Energy, and in 2012 for a series entitled PSL Tapes, concerning recordings of conversations between politicians of the Polish People's Party, suggesting nepotism and mismanagement in State Treasury companies.

Since January 2015, he has been collaborating with the weekly "Gazeta Polska", the daily "Gazeta Polska Codziennie" and the portal Niezalezna.pl. He was the host of the program "Rozmowa Ścisle Jawna" (Strictly Public Conversation) broadcast on Telewizja Republika. In 2022–2023, he collaborated with TVP Info, where he hosted a weekly, original program "Śledczym Okiem" (Through the Investigative Eye) and, together with Szymon Wochal, co-created a series of reports on the history of the Polish mafia entitled "Ludzie z Miasta" (People from the City). For several years, he also collaborated with Polskie Radio 24, where he hosted, among others, the program "W cieniu Afer" (In the Shadow of Scandals).

Author of the publication Jak rozpętałem aferę taśmową (How I Unleashed the Tape Scandal, 2014), for which he received the Polish "Watergate Award" for 2014 on January 30, 2015, awarded by the Association of Polish Journalists. In 2019, Nisztor published the book Rekiny Wojny. Kto naprawdę zarabia na handlu polską bronią? (War Sharks: Who Really Profits from Trading Polish Weapons?), detailing the inner workings of export contracts concluded by the state-owned arms manufacturer Bumar (now Polski Holding Obronny).

Since 2022, he has hosted various current affairs programs on Telewizja Republika. In 2024, he also hosted selected editions of the talk show "Gość Jutro" on that station and joined the editorial team of the satirical and current affairs magazine "Piachem w tryby" (Sand in the gears). Since May 2024, he has also hosted the investigative magazine "Ściśle jawne" (Strictly public).

== Selected publications ==
Nisztor is the author of numerous articles and published press releases. He has also written or co-authored several books.

- 2010 – Kto naprawdę ich zabił? (with Krzysztof Galimski) ISBN 9788393126439
- 2014 – Nietykalni: kulisy polskich prywatyzacji. Prawdziwa historia gospodarcza III RP (with Wojciech Dudziński) ISBN 9788379650200
- 2014 – Jak rozpętałem aferę taśmową ISBN 9788364095528
- 2015 – Jan Kulczyk: biografia niezwykła (with Cezary Bielakowski) ISBN 9788380790032
- 2017 – Skok na banki: kto kontroluje pieniądze Polaków ISBN 9788380791718
- 2019 – Rekiny wojny: kto naprawdę zarabia na handlu polską bronią ISBN 9788380794283
