= Magdalena Czarzyńska-Jachim =

Mayor of Sopot since 2023

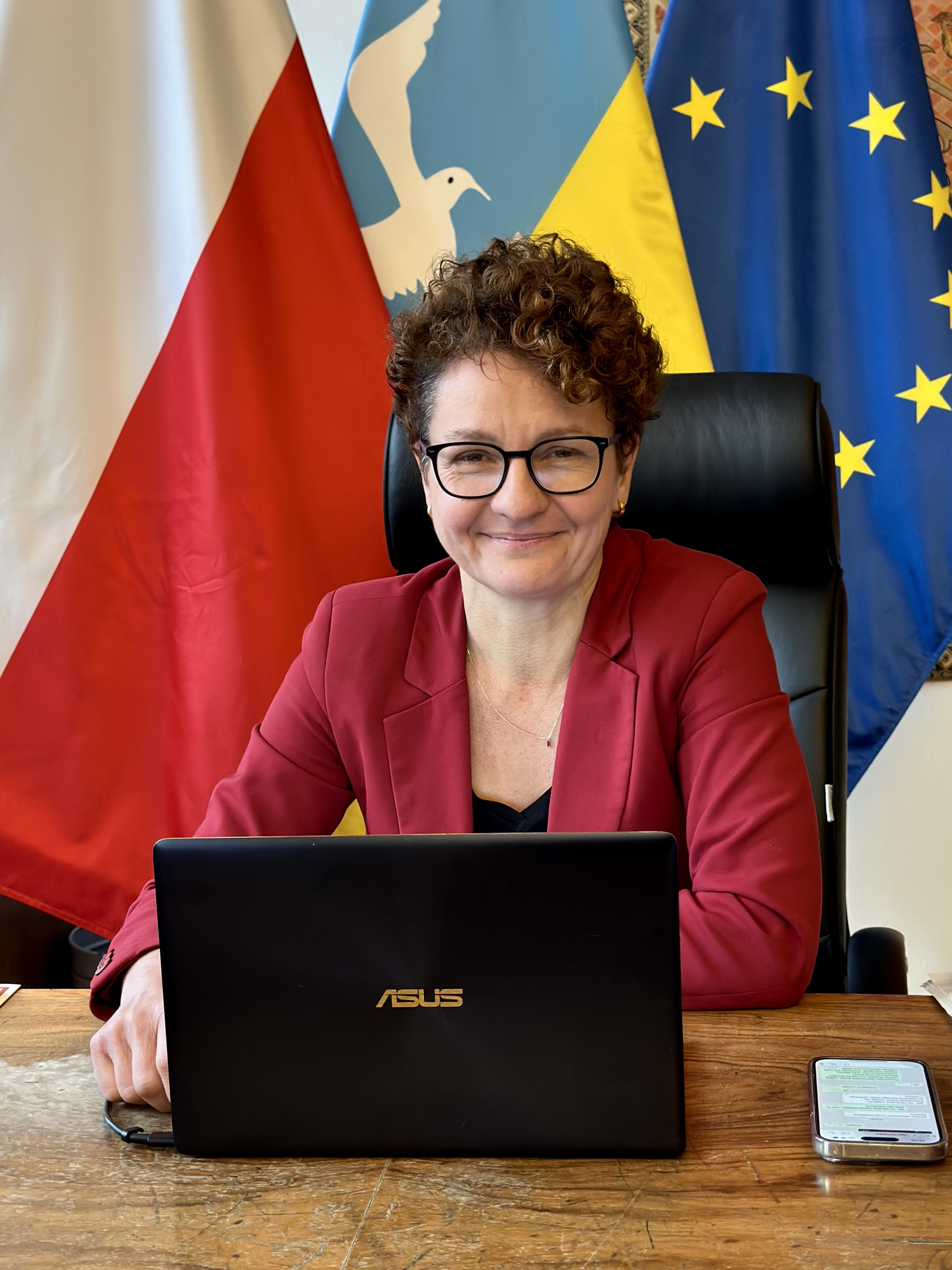
- Czarszyńska-Jachim in 2023

Mayor of Sopot
- Incumbent
- Assumed office 22 December 2023
- Preceded by: Lucjan Brudzyński (acting)

Deputy Mayor of Sopot
- In office 4 November 2019 – 15 November 2023

Personal details
- Born: 22 September 1972 (age 53) Gdańsk, Poland
- Party: Independent (Supported by Civic Coalition, The Left and Together)
- Children: 3
- Education: University of Gdańsk

Magdalena Czarzyńska-Jachim (born 22 September 1972) is a Polish politician who, since 2023, has been serving as mayor of Sopot. Prior to 2024, she was the city's acting mayor. She filled the role of deputy mayor from 2019 to 2023 and was a spokeswoman for the city before assuming that role. She is the founder and chairwoman of the association Sopot dla Ciebie.

== Life and career ==
Born in Gdańsk in 1972, in 1996, she graduated with a master's degree from the history department of the University of Gdańsk, in addition to completing postgraduate studies at Kozminski University in Warsaw.

In 2006, she became a spokeswoman for the city of Sopot, prior to which she had been a journalist for Dziennik Bałtycki. From 2010 to 2019, she headed the city's Office for Promotion and Social Communication. In 2019, after the resignation of the previous deputy mayor of Sopot, Joanna Cichocka-Gula, mayor Jacek Karnowski appointed her the new deputy mayor; she assumed the role on 4 November 2019.

She oversaw social policy, education, healthcare, communication with citizens, promotion, and tourism. She also superintended the Sopot Hippodrome, the Forest Opera, the beaches, and the Sopot Pier, among other buildings and institutions.

When Czarzyńska-Jachim's superior Karnowski was elected to the Sejm in 2023, on 15 November 2023, prime minister Mateusz Morawiecki appointed former Polish Scouting and Guiding Association leader Lucjan Brudzyński to the role. However, on 22 December, Donald Tusk, the then recently-elected prime minister, appointed the previous deputy the new mayor.

She is the founder and moderator of the Sopot Women's Meetings (Polish: Sopockie Spotkania Kobiet). They are regular debates occurring since 2020 regarding various topics concerning women, including the Istanbul Convention, female education, mental health of youth, sexual education, free time, and women's health. She founded a youth council in Sopot in 2020, as well as youth participatory budgeting in 2022.

Since the beginning of the Russian invasion of Ukraine, Czarzyńska-Jachim has been heavily involved in providing aid for those affected by the war. In August 2023, she announced her candidacy for the 2024 Polish local elections to formally become mayor of Sopot, having been acting mayor up to that point. She won in the first round, receiving 59.27% of the vote. She was inaugurated on 7 May 2024, officially becoming the first woman to be mayor of Sopot.

== Honours ==
In 2024, she received the Cross of the Home Army for her efforts to spread knowledge of the wartime and post-war fates of Home Army soldiers. She was given the Power of Women Award in 2023 by the 57th Battalion of the Armed Forces of Ukraine for her support for the troops.

== See also ==
- Aleksandra Dulkiewicz
- Aleksandra Kosiorek
- Beata Rutkiewicz
