= Jacek Karnowski =

Polish politician and former mayor of Sopot

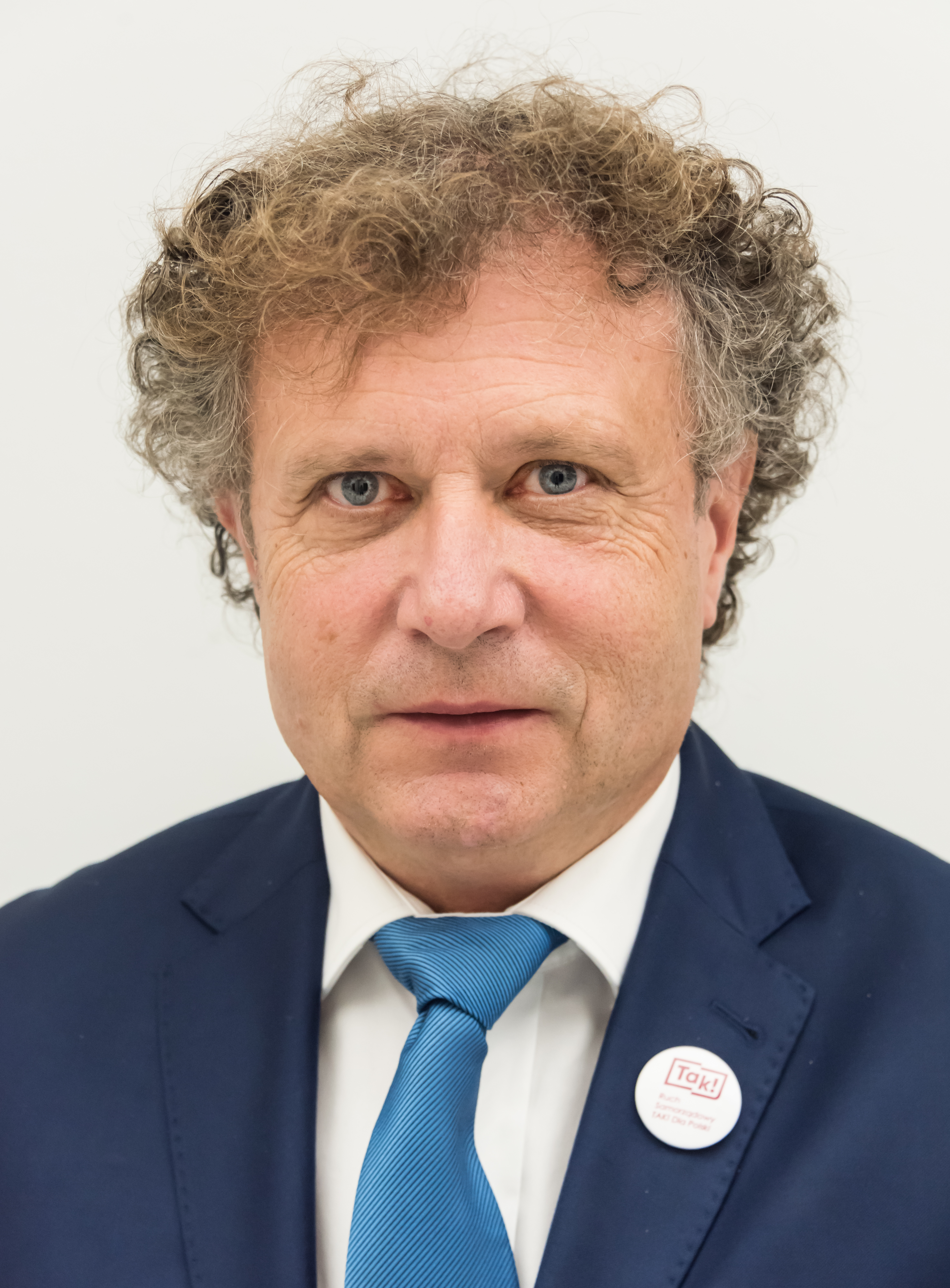
- Karnowski in 2023

Minister of State of the Ministry of Development Funds and Regional Policy
- Incumbent
- Assumed office 25 June 2024

Mayor of Sopot
- In office 1998–2023
- Preceded by: Jan Kozłowski
- Succeeded by: Lucjan Brudzyński

Personal details
- Born: 16 August 1963 (age 63) Gdańsk, Poland
- Party: Civic Platform (since 2001)
- Other political affiliations: Solidarity Electoral Action (1998–2001); Conservative People's Party (1997–1998); Conservative Party (1992–1997); Republican Coalition (1991–1992)
- Education: Gdańsk University of Technology

Jacek Krzysztof Karnowski (born 16 August 1963) is a Polish politician who has been serving as Minister of State of the Ministry of Development Funds and Regional Policy since 25 June 2024 and served as Mayor of Sopot from 1998 to 2023. He has also been the chairman of Yes! For Poland since 2021 and a member of the Sejm since 2023.

== Life and career ==
Jacek Krzysztof Karnowski was born on 16 August 1963 in Gdańsk. His father was a worker at the Railway Directorate in Gdańsk. In 1988, he graduated from the Land Construction Department of the Gdańsk University of Technology.

During his studies, Karnowski became involved with the Movement of Young Poland. From 1990 to 1998, he was deputy mayor of Sopot. He was an active member of various parties in the 1990s, including the Conservative Party and Conservative People's Party, and was re-elected in 1998 on the ticket of Solidarity Electoral Action, becoming mayor shortly after. He would later join the Civic Platform.

In July 2008, Stanisław Julke, an entrepreneur, informed the local procuratorate of a reported illegal dealing involving Karnowski, wherein the mayor wanted compensation in the form of two flats in exchange for adding a floor to a historic tenement, beginning the so-called "Sopot affair" (Polish: afera sopocka). Karnowski disagreed and stated that the entrepreneur wanted to renovate the historic building, but was sent to a conservator-restorer. After a recording of a conversation he had on the matter was revealed to the public, he suspended his Civic Platform membership and then resigned from the party.

In January 2009, he was accused of eight corruption-related charges by a procurator, intending to put him in pre-trial detention, but this was dismissed by the court. Karnowski then proposed a referendum that would decide whether he would be removed from the mayoral role. A request signed by 4,500 people was submitted to the Electoral Committee in Gdańsk, and the vote was scheduled for 17 May 2009. Voter turnout, around 40%, was enough to make the referendum valid, and 62% of voters voted not to remove Karnowski.

In June 2010, the procurator of the appeal procuratorate in Gdańsk indicted Karnowski of six of the eight original charges. In September, a court of first instance rejected the charges, as there was not enough evidence to prove the mayor's guilt. In December 2011, the same procuratorate indicted Karnowski of four charges. They were progressively dismissed by courts until, in 2015, the Sopot Regional Court of First Instance cleared Karnowski of a majority of them, which was upheld by a court in Gdańsk in 2016.

Jacek won re-election in 2006, 2010, 2014, and 2018. In 2021, he became the chairman of Yes! For Poland. In the 2023 Polish parliamentary election, he was successfully elected to the Sejm as a member of the Civic Coalition. As a result, he stopped being mayor of Sopot. He was succeeded by Polish Scouting and Guiding Association leader Lucjan Brudzyński and then the former deputy mayor, Magdalena Czarzyńska-Jachim. On 26 June 2024, he became the Secretary of State of the Ministry of Development Funds and Regional Policy and rejoined the Civic Platform on 5 June 2025.

== Honours ==
In 2003, Karnowski was awarded with the Silver Cross of Merit. He also received the Honorary Medal for Service to Territorial Governance in 2015.

== See also ==
- Paweł Adamowicz
- Aleksandra Dulkiewicz
- Wojciech Szczurek
