= Tricity, Poland =

Tricity Trójmiasto
- Urban agglomeration
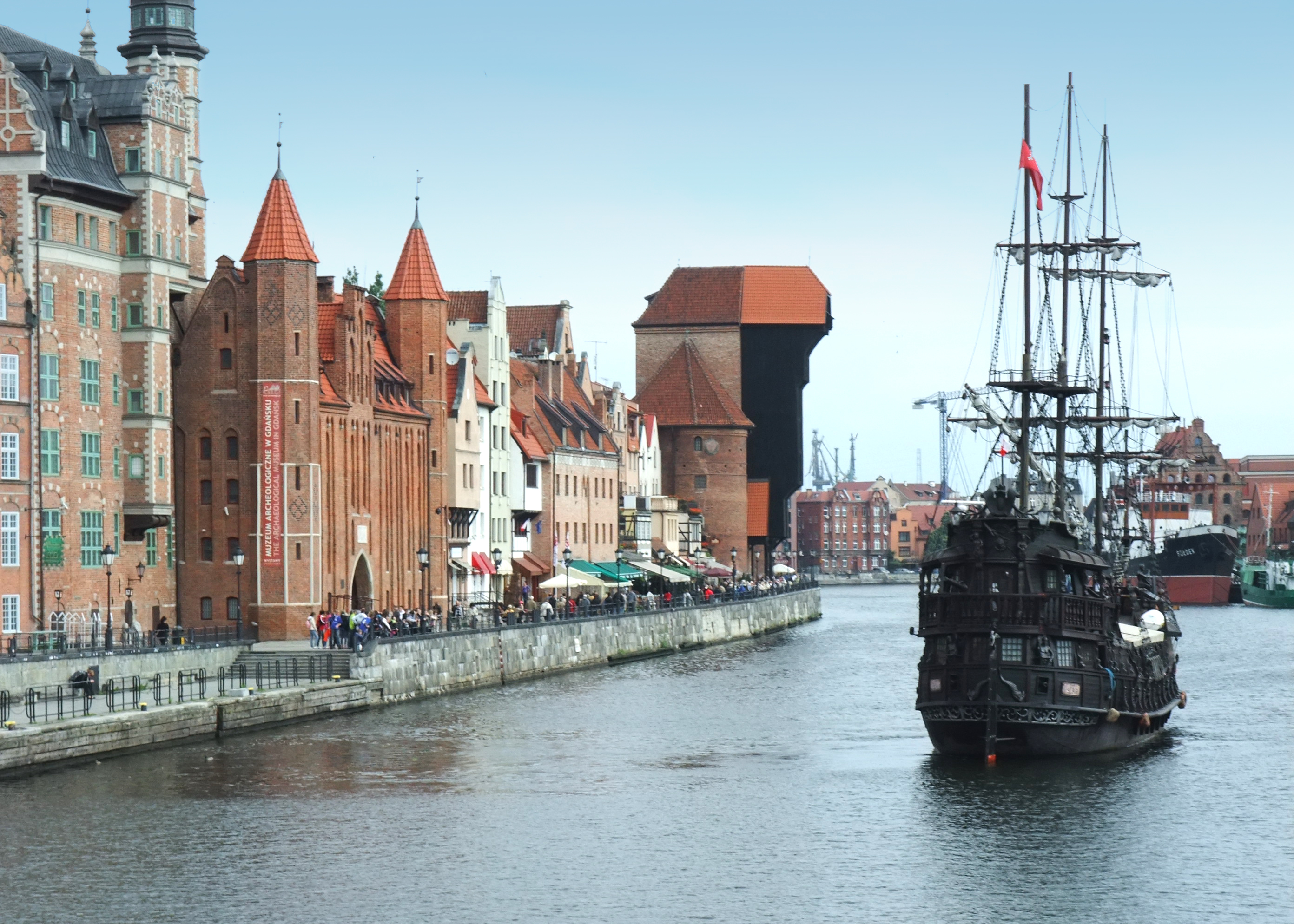
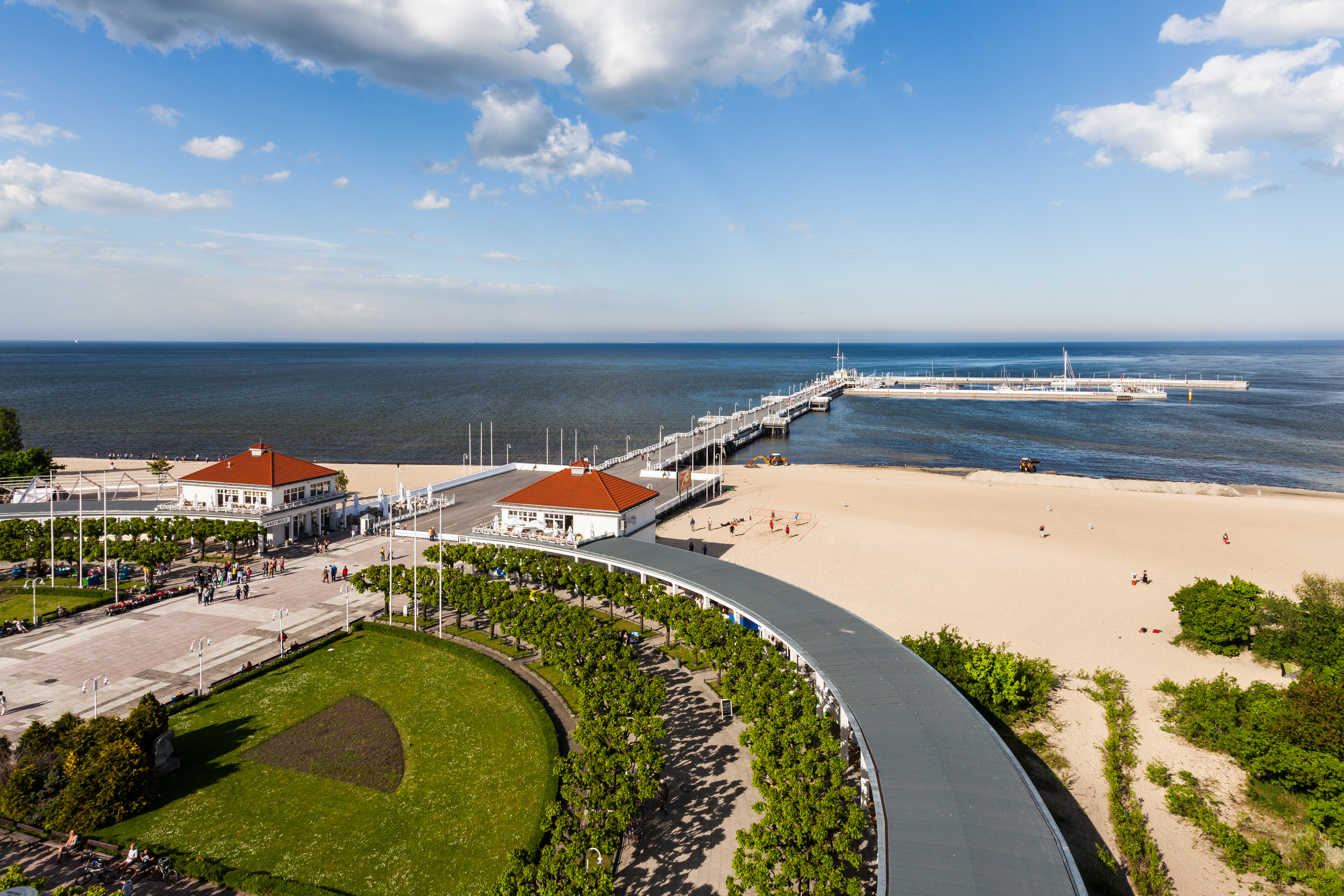
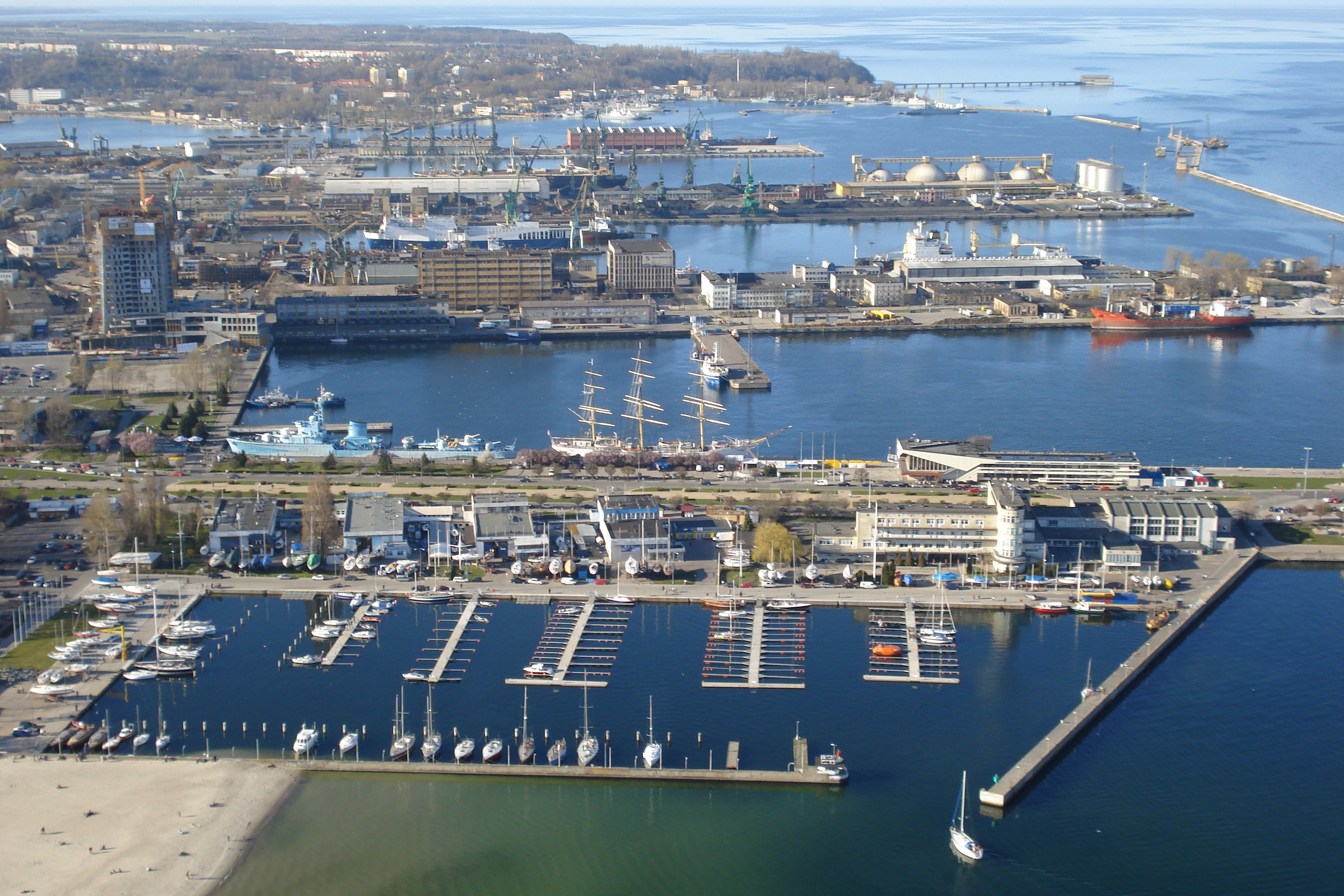
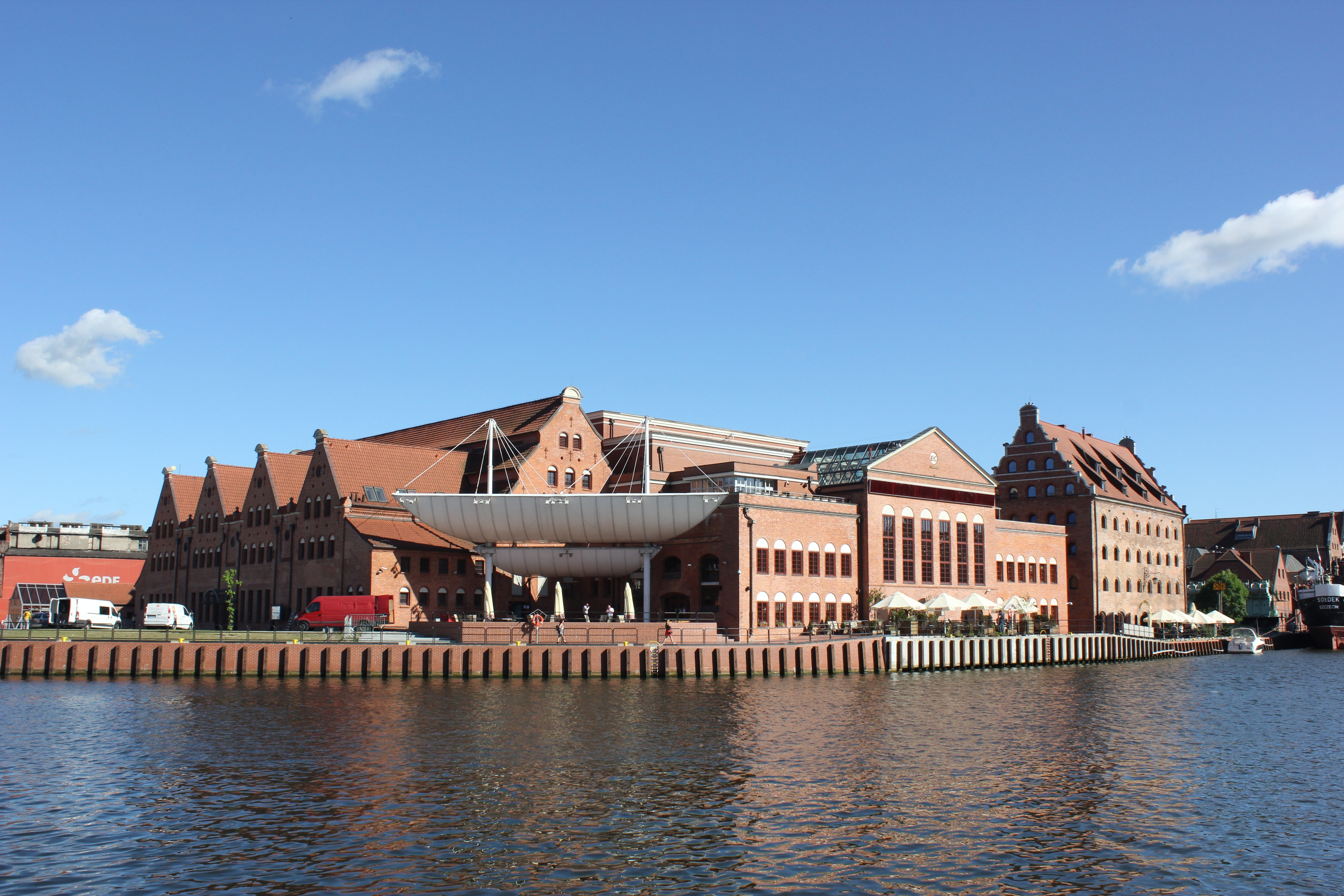
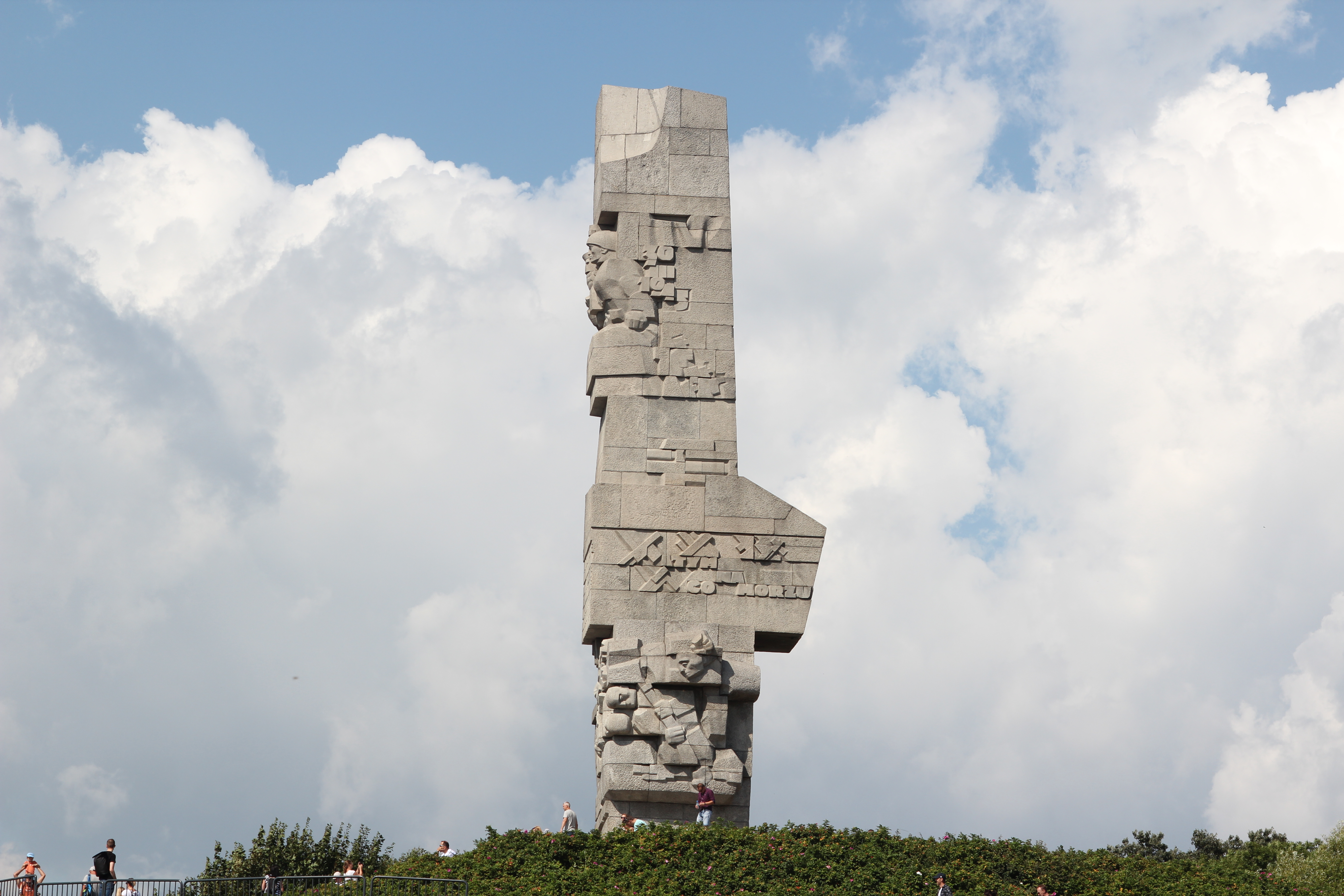
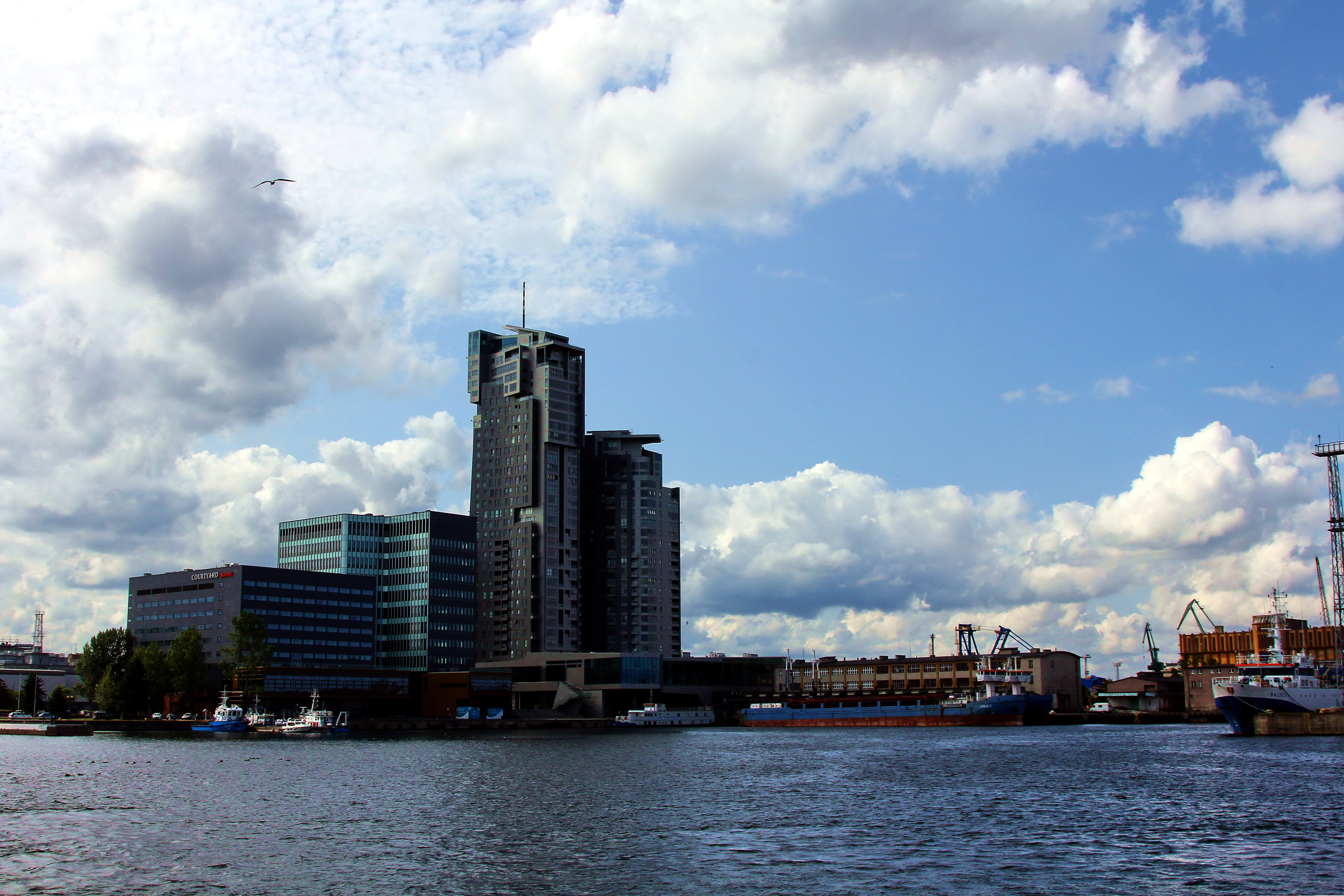
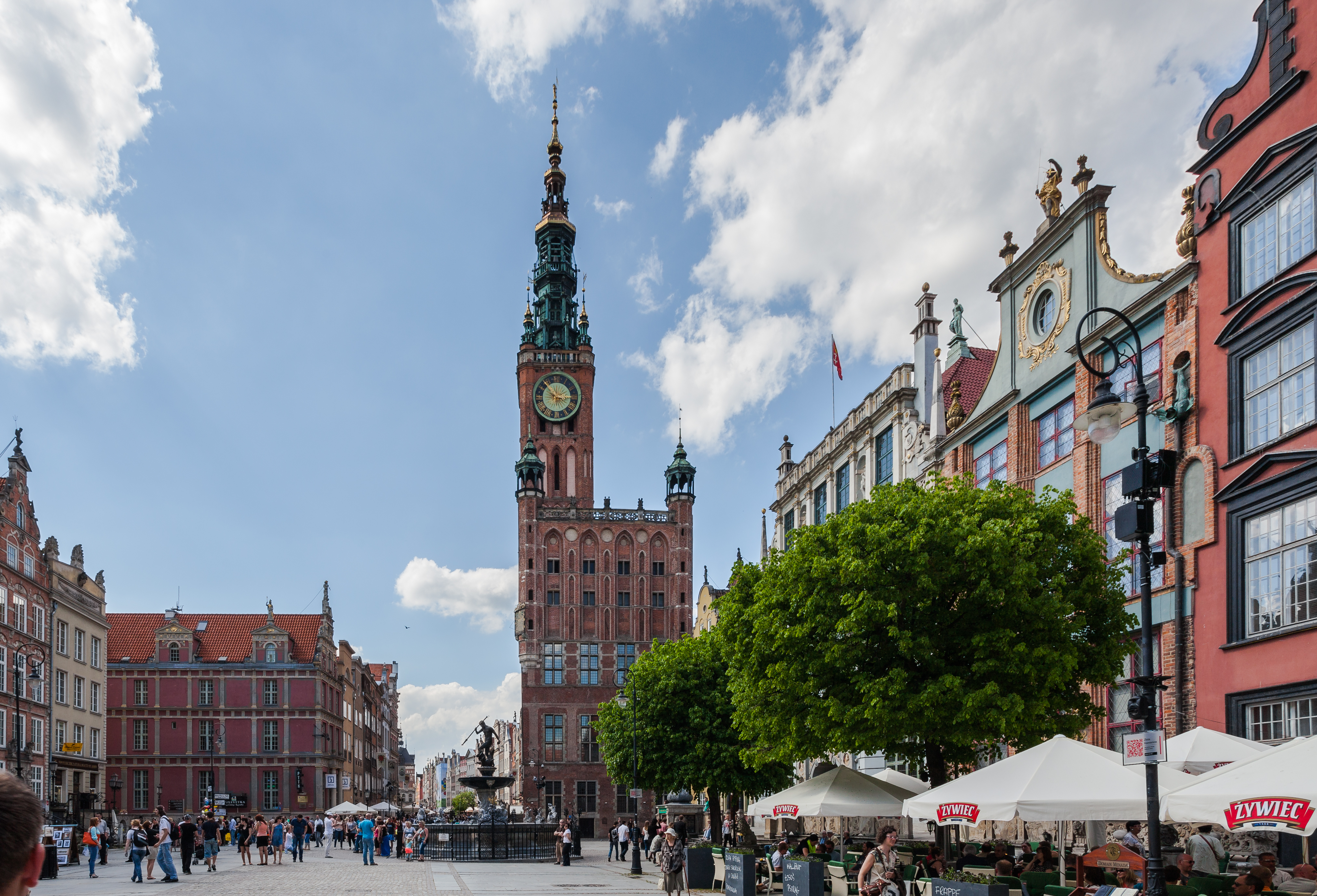
- Clockwise from top: Gdańsk; Gdynia; Westerplatte Monument; Gdańsk Town Hall; Sea Towers; Polish Baltic Philharmonic; Pier in Sopot

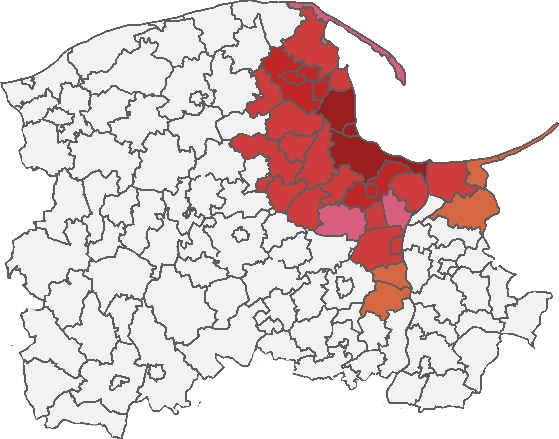
- A map of the Tricity agglomeration

- Location within Poland
- Coordinates: 54°26′N 18°33′E
- Country: Poland
- Voivodeship: Pomeranian

Government
  - Mayor of Gdańsk: Aleksandra Dulkiewicz
  - Mayor of Gdynia: Aleksandra Kosiorek
  - Mayor of Sopot: Magdalena Czarzyńska-Jachim

Area
  - Total: 2,077 km^{2} (802 sq mi)

Population (2024)
  - Total: 1,090,000
  - Density: 525/km^{2} (1,360/sq mi)
- Time zone: UTC+1 (CET)
  - Summer (DST): UTC+2 (CEST)
- Area code: +48 058

Tricity (Polish: Trójmiasto; German: Dreistadt; Kashubian: Trzëgard) is an urban area in Pomeranian Voivodeship, in northern Poland, primarily consisting of the cities of Gdańsk, Gdynia, and Sopot on the shore of Gdańsk Bay. Inhabited by 960,000 people within the boundaries of the three cities, and approximately 1.09 million people across the surrounding metropolitan area, it is one of the principal urban areas of Poland and is home to several governmental institutions.

The concept of a singular Tricity metropolitan area first emerged following World War II, and the term is today widely used in several official and unofficial contexts.

== Etymology and terminology ==
The Polish term Trójmiasto was first mentioned in the 1 February 1950 issue of Dziennik Bałtycki, within a headline regarding the integration of the three cities of Gdańsk, Sopot, and Gdynia. Tricity has also been referred to as the Gdańsk metropolitan area or the Gdańsk agglomeration.

== History ==
The recorded history of Gdańsk, the oldest city in the Tricity area, goes back to as far as the year 997; Sopot was first mentioned in 1283, and Gdynia, although extant as a small village as early as 1253, was only granted city rights in 1926, after the Polish government began an effort to expand it as a port to rival Gdańsk, which had become an independent free city following the Treaty of Versailles.

The first time the three settlements would find themselves under the same administration as cities occurred in 1939, following the invasion of Poland. They were all placed under the occupation of Nazi Germany, which played a significant role in unifying and organizing the administrations of Gdańsk and Gdynia. In 1946, shortly after Poland retook all three cities, a nearly successful proposal was filed to unite them into one, though it ultimately failed. The first known mention of the Polish term Trójmiasto is found in a 1950 issue of Dziennik Bałtycki, a regional newspaper, and in the 1950s, various pan-Tricity organizations and publications were founded.

== Geography ==
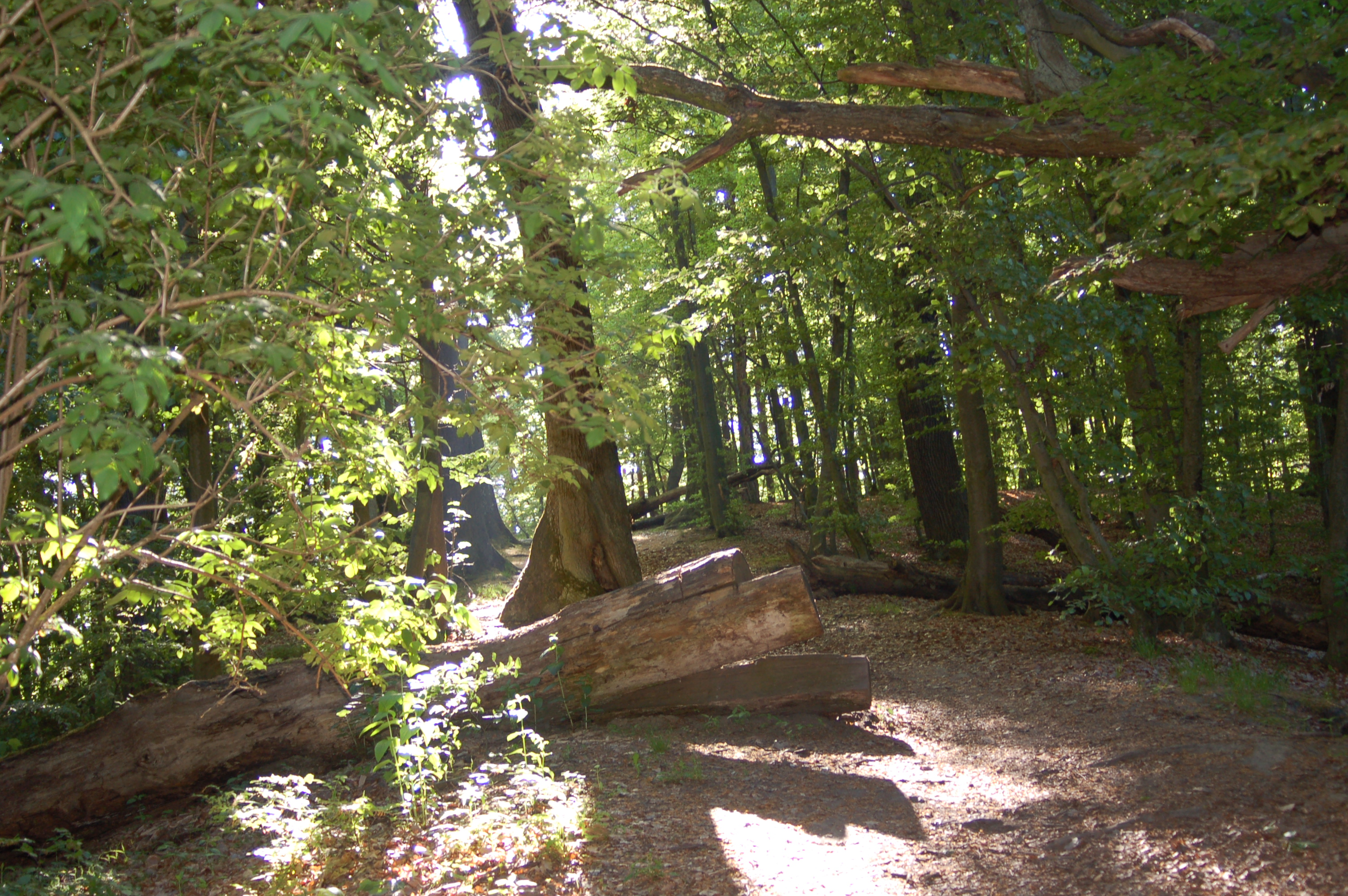
A forested area of the Tricity Landscape Park

Tricity is traditionally defined as consisting of the cities of Gdańsk, Sopot, and Gdynia; however, the broader metropolitan area also includes Tczew, Pruszcz Gdański, Kartuzy, Żukowo, Rumia, Wejherowo, Puck, Władysławowo, Jastarnia, and Hel. Gdańsk is at the core of Tricity, hosting most of its central administrative functions, but it is well-integrated with Gdynia and Sopot, as well as the other surrounding settlements. The area is located on the shore of Gdańsk Bay, a bay of the Baltic Sea.

Map of Tricity

Tricity, despite its seaside location, has varied terrain; Gdańsk is divided into two areas of higher and lower elevation referred to as the Upper Terrace (Górny Taras) and Lower Terrace (Dolny Taras) respectively, with the Upper Terrace reaching altitudes of up to 180 metres (590 ft), whereas the lowest point of the Lower Terrace is found at 1.6 metres (5.2 ft) below sea level.

Tricity is generally bounded by hilly terrain to the east, covered by the Tricity Landscape Park and found at the western edge of the elevated Kashubian Lake District. On the other hand, its coastal areas to the west have allowed for the formation of low-lying and accessible beaches, although some are still surrounded by extreme features such as the Orłowo Cliff.

Tricity has a total land area of approximately 2,077 km^{2} (802 mi^{2}), with broader definitions extending it to 4,157 km^{2} (1,605 mi^{2}).

== Economy ==
Tricity, because of its favourable geographic position and infrastructure, is home to numerous companies, as well as large industrial and service sectors. The largest companies in Tricity include the energy company Energa, fashion company LPP, insurance company Ergo Hestia, the Polish branches of Viterra and Jysk, Remontowa and Gdańsk Shipyard, and the Polish branch of Intel.

== Main sights ==
Notable attractions in Gdańsk include the Main City Hall, Artus Court, Neptune's Fountain, Uphagen's House, St. Mary's Church, Great Mill, Gdańsk Crane, European Solidarity Centre, Museum of the Second World War, and the National Museum. Attractions in Gdynia include the Emigration Museum, Kościuszko Square, the ships Dar Pomorza and ORP Błyskawica, and the Orłowo Cliff. The Sopot Pier, Sopot Lighthouse, Bohaterów Monte Cassino Street, and the Grand Hotel are among the attractions in Sopot.

== Transport ==
=== Road ===
The S6 and S7 expressways go through or around Tricity; a part of the former is known as the Tricity Ring Road. As of 2007, 43.5% of commuters in Tricity went to work by car.

=== Rail ===
The Tricity Rapid Urban Railway (SKM) is a commuter railway that primarily operates services in Rumia, Gdynia, Sopot, and Gdańsk; however, its network extends beyond these cities, as far as Tczew and Lębork. The Pomeranian Metropolitan Railway, opened in 2015, operates trains from Gdańsk Wrzeszcz via the airport to Gdynia Główna. Gdańsk Główny and Gdynia Główna both serve a large amount of national and international destinations, largely operated by PKP Intercity. In 2007, 12.8% of commuters in Tricity went to work by train, the largest such percentage among all other major agglomerations and metropolitan areas in Poland.

=== Buses ===
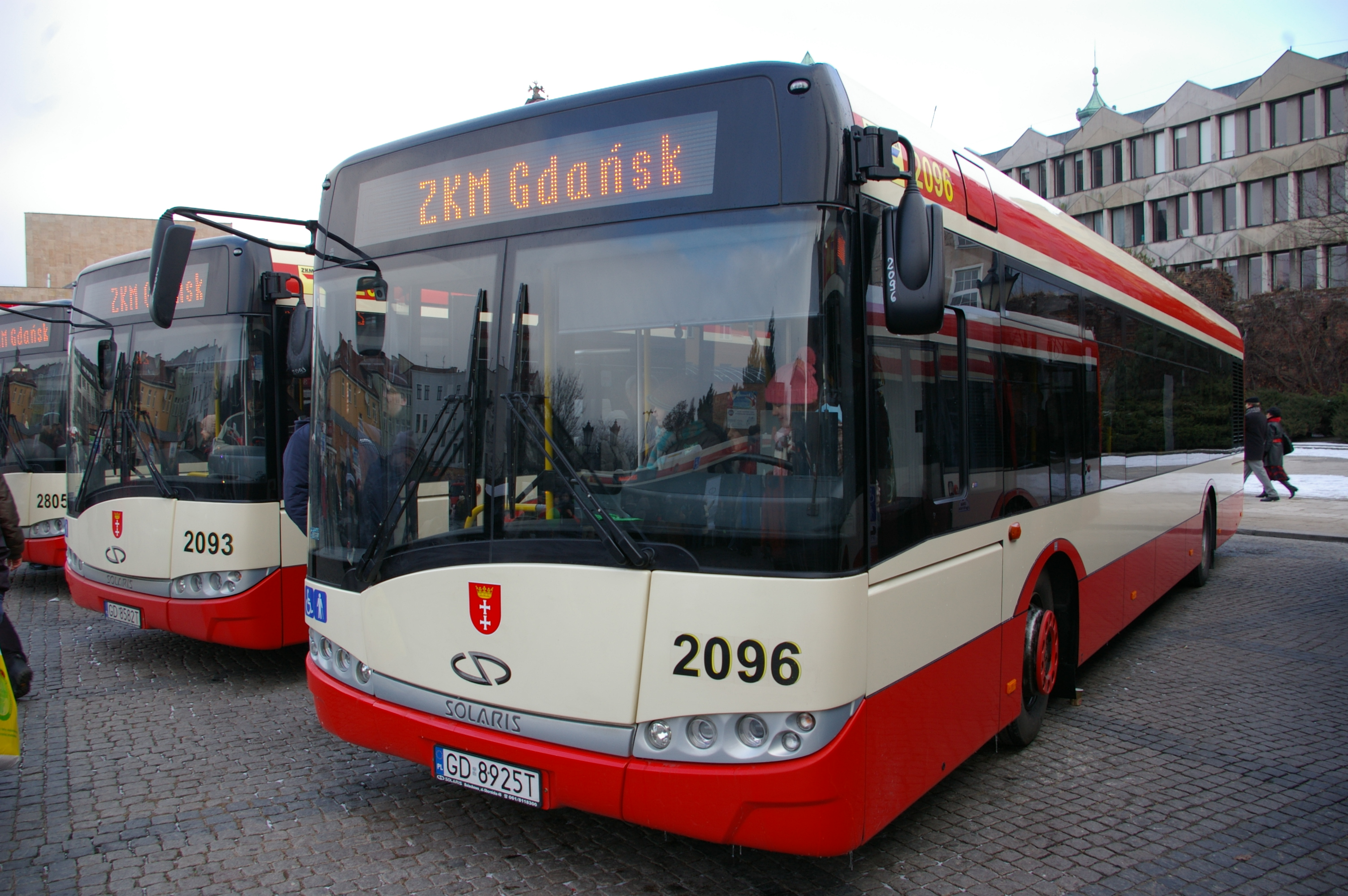
A Solaris Urbino 12 operated by the city public transport authority of Gdańsk

Gdańsk and Gdynia both have city bus networks. Gdańsk's bus system has 76 regular routes, 13 night routes, and 1 seasonal route, and operates in many surrounding towns and gminas, including Sopot. Gdynia's bus and trolleybus system has 79 regular routes, 9 express routes, and 7 night routes, also extending to the surrounding gminas and to Sopot. As of 2007, 32.6% of Tricity inhabitants commuted to work by bus.

=== Trams and trolleybuses ===
Gdańsk has a fully-developed tram system, with 11 lines and a total track length of 65 km (40 mi). As of 2007, 6.8% of Tricity inhabitants commuted to work by tram. Gdynia, on the other hand, has one of the few trolleybus systems in all of Poland, with 12 regular trolleybus routes in the city.

=== Air and sea connections ===
The principal airport of the Tricity area is Gdańsk Lech Wałęsa Airport, which has connections to cities and airports in several nations, primarily in Europe, and processed 6,714,149 passengers in total in 2024, as well as 11,681 t (12,876 short tons) of freight. Additionally, Stena Line operates ferries from Gdynia to Karlskrona, and Polferries operates a ferry service between Gdańsk and Nynäshamn. Żegluga Gdańska also operates voyages from Sopot, Gdynia, and Gdańsk to Hel, from central Gdańsk to Westerplatte, and from Gdynia to the Vistula Spit, as well as tours of the Port of Gdynia.

== Sport ==
Lechia Gdańsk and Arka Gdynia are the central association football teams of each of their respective cities, competing against one another each year in the Tricity Derby. RC Lechia Gdańsk, Ogniwo Sopot, and RC Arka Gdynia, the rugby union teams for their respective cities, have all repeatedly been national champions in the sport. Wybrzeże Gdańsk is a historically very successful handball team and the basketball team Arka Gdynia has also seen repeated success in its respective discipline. Other notable teams include Trefl Gdańsk (volleyball) and Seahawks Gdynia (American football).

== Politics ==
Gdańsk, Sopot, and Gdynia, all officially being considered cities under Polish law, function within the bounds of the officially outlined regulations and procedures of city governments. The mayor of Gdańsk is Aleksandra Dulkiewicz; the mayor of Gdynia is Aleksandra Kosiorek; and the mayor of Sopot is Magdalena Czarzyńska-Jachim. In the 2023 Polish parliamentary election, 46.67% of voters in Gdańsk voted for the Civic Coalition, 20.01% voted for Law and Justice, 14.47% voted for Trzecia Droga, and 10.97% voted for The Left. In Sopot, the percentages were 53.72% for the Civic Coalition, 20.46% for Law and Justice, 10.02% for Trzecia Droga, and 9.72% for The Left. In Gdynia, 46.74% voted for the Civic Coalition, 20.26% voted for Law and Justice, 13.66% voted for Trzecia Droga, and 11.25% voted for The Left.

Each of the cities of the Tricity is divided into districts (dzielnice). Gdańsk is subdivided into 36 (see Districts of Gdańsk), and the largest of them by population are Śródmieście, Przymorze Wielkie, Chełm, Wrzeszcz Dolny, and Wrzeszcz Górny. Gdynia has 21 districts, with the most populous ones there being Chylonia, Obłuże, Chwarzno-Wiczlino, Witomino, and Oksywie. Sopot consists of six districts: Karlikowo, Dolny Sopot, Górny Sopot, Świemirowo, Kamienny Potok, and Brodwino.

== Education ==
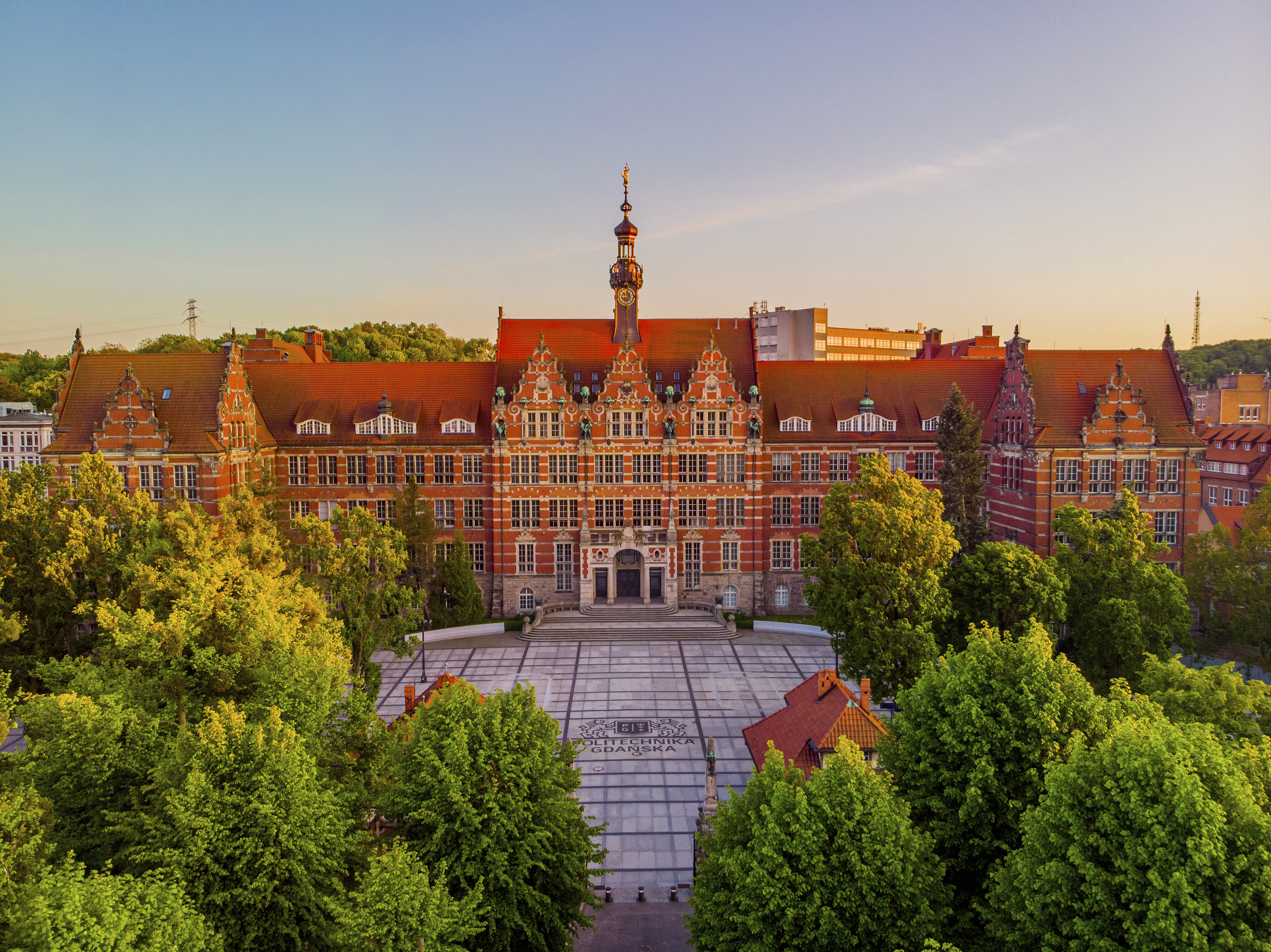
The Gdańsk University of Technology

Gdańsk is home to several universities and academies, including the University of Gdańsk, Gdańsk University of Technology, Academy of Fine Arts in Gdańsk, and Gdańsk Medical University. The Gdynia Maritime University and Polish Naval Academy are found in Gdynia.

== Demographics ==
In 2024, 960,000 people lived in Tricity proper, whereas the total population of the metropolitan area in 2021 was approximately 1.09 million. Of the three cities of the urban area, Gdańsk is inhabited by 487,371 people; Gdynia by 245,222 people; and Sopot by 32,962 people. Tricity is among the largest agglomerations in all of Poland, being the fourth-largest in the country as of 2023, behind the metropolitan areas of Warsaw, Katowice, and Kraków.

== See also ==
- Little Kashubian Tricity
- Metropolitan areas in Poland
- Trivillage, Kociewie
