= Aleksandra Kosiorek =

Polish politician and jurist

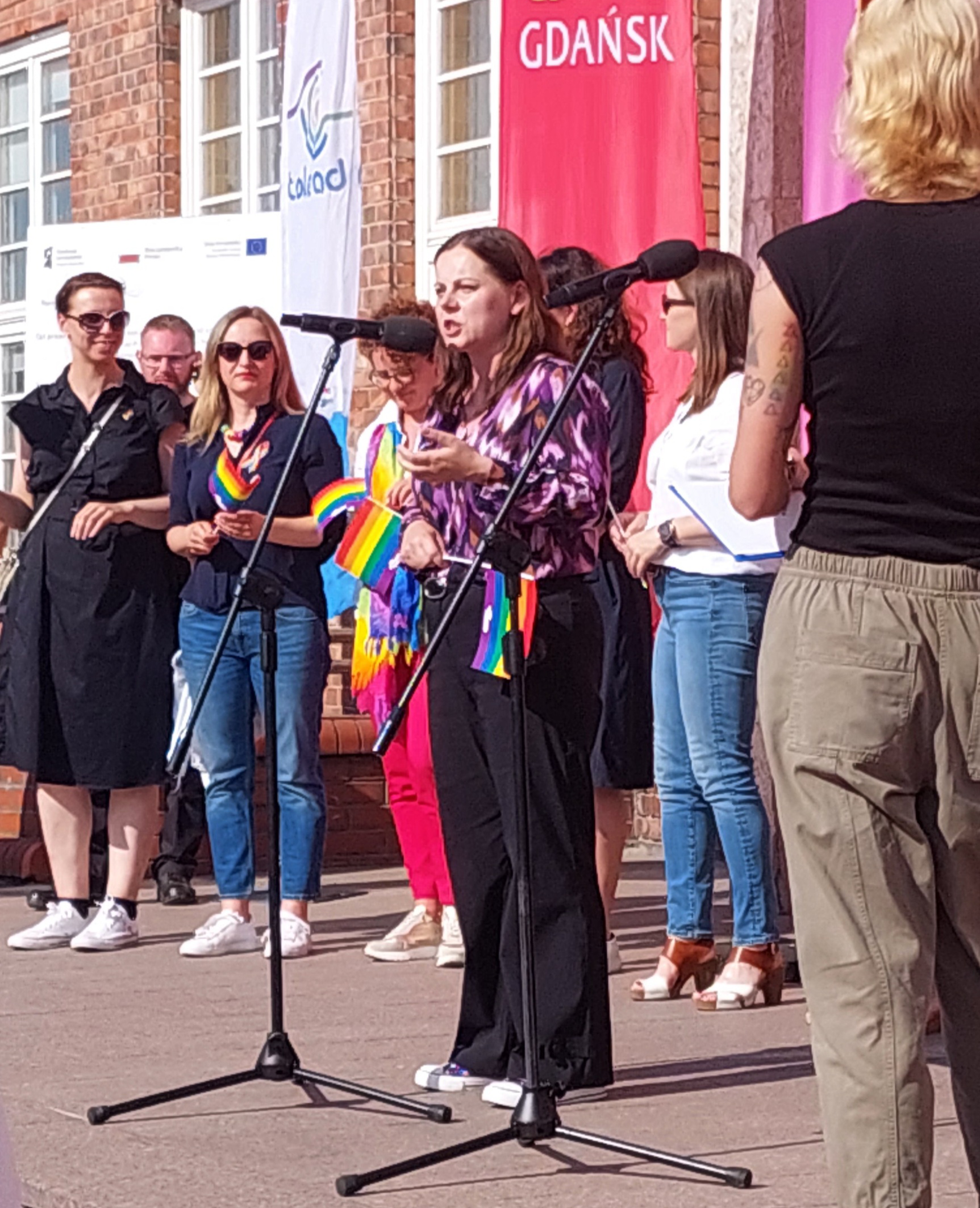

Mayor of Gdynia
- Incumbent
- Assumed office 7 May 2024
- Preceded by: Wojciech Szczurek

Personal details
- Born: 13 March 1985 (age 41) Gdańsk, Poland
- Party: Gdynia Dialogue Federation
- Education: University of Gdańsk
- Occupation: Politician; Jurist

Aleksandra Monika Kosiorek (Polish: [a.lɛkˈsan.dra ˈma.rja kɔˈɕɔ.rɛk]; née Czaja, Polish: [ˈt͡ʂa.ja]; born 13 March 1985) is a politician and jurist. Since 2024, she serves as the mayor of Gdynia, Poland.

== Biography ==
Aleksandra Kosiorek (née Czaja) was born on 13 March 1985 in Gdańsk in Pomeranian Voivodeship, Poland. Her family on her father's side comes from the towns of Kartuzy and Bącka Huta in Pomeranian Voivodeship, within the ethnocultural region of Kashubia. Kosiorek graduated in law from the University of Gdańsk, and afterwards began working as a jurist. Since 2013, she has been a co-owner of a legal firm and a court mediator specialised in the medical law. Since 2020, Kosiorek is a coordinator of a legal team in the Gdańsk District Medical Chamber.

Kosiorek is also a social activist, and a member of the Gdynia Dialogue Federation, a local social and political movement. In the late 2010s, and early 2020s, she was one of the organisers of the protests against judiciary reforms and the women's strike protests in the Tricity, and one of the leaders of the All-Poland Women's Strike movement. She was elected as mayor of Gdynia in the 2024 local election, as a candidate of the Gdynia Dialogue Federation. She received 33,010 votes (34.43%) in the primary election, and 47,248 votes (62.49%) in the secondary election. In the same elections, she was also elected as a member of the Gdynia City Council, receiving 3,586 votes (15.81%) from the third municipal constituency, but unable to legally share both offices, ultimately assumed the position of mayor instead. She began her term on 7 May 2024.

== Personal life ==
Kosiorek has a husband and two children.

== Electoral results ==
Year	Office		Party	Constituency	Primary			Secondary			Result	Ref.
Year	Office		Party	Constituency	Total	%	P.	Total	%	P.	Result	Ref.
2024	Mayor of Gdynia	7th	Gdynia Dialogue Federation	—N/a	33,010	34.43	1st	47,248	62.49	1st	Won	
2024	Gdynia City Council	9th	Gdynia Dialogue Federation	No. 3	3,586	15.81	1st	—N/a			Won (Note: Kosiorek did not assume the office.)	
