= Little Kashubian Tricity =

Urban area in northern Poland

Coordinates: 54.5958°N 18.3292°E

Little Kashubian Tricity Môłi Kaszëbsczi Trójgard
- Urban agglomeration
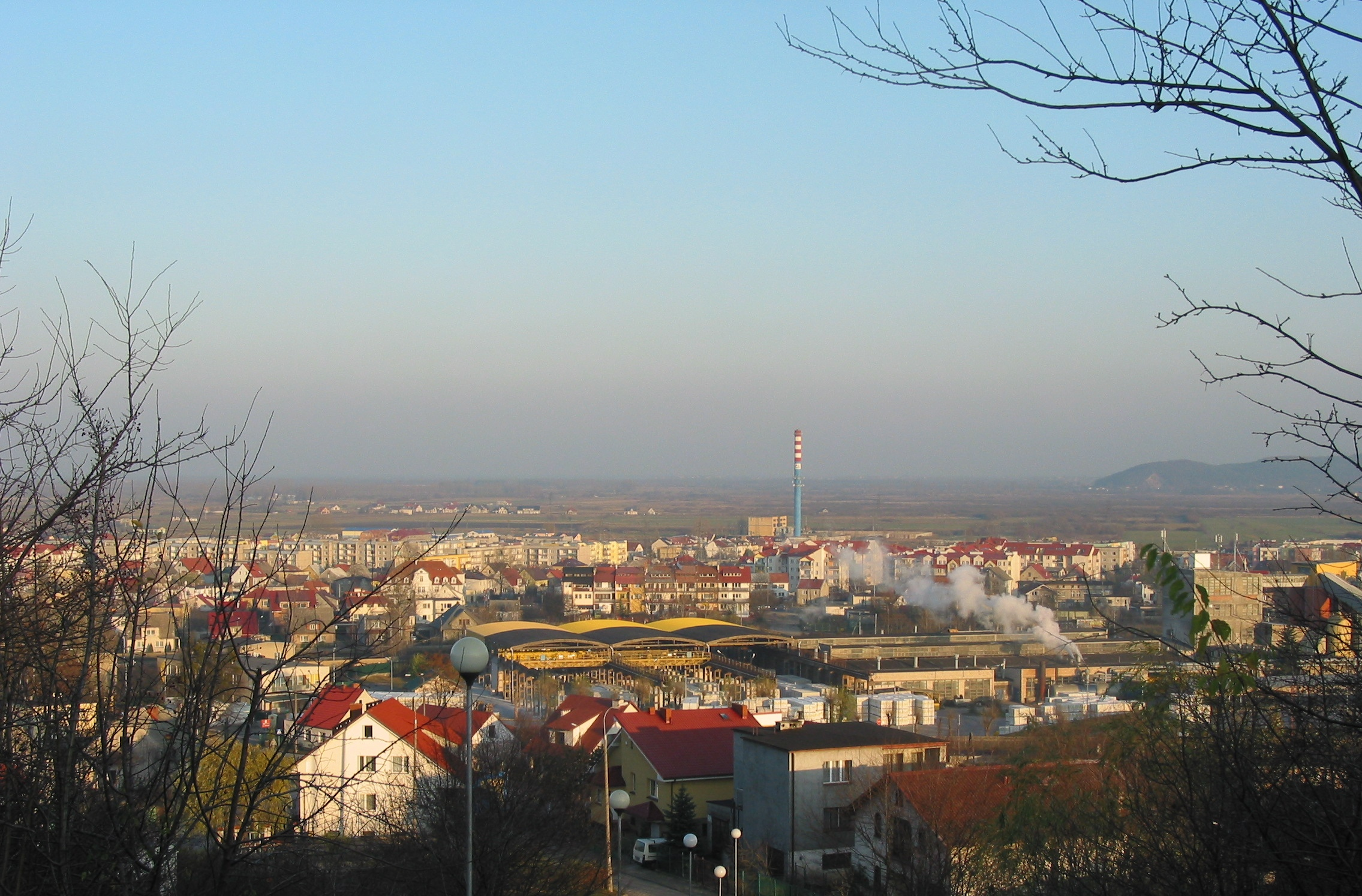
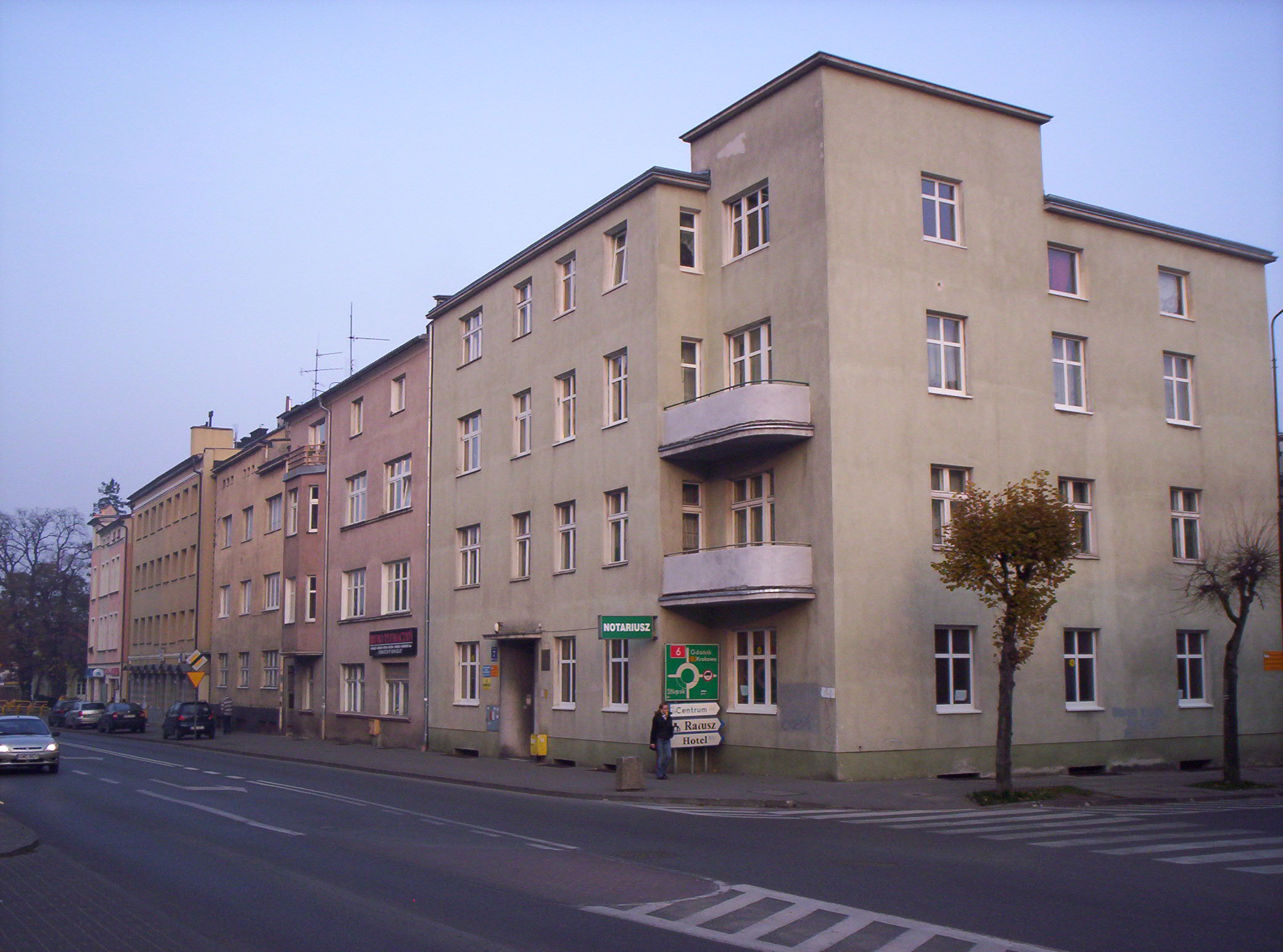
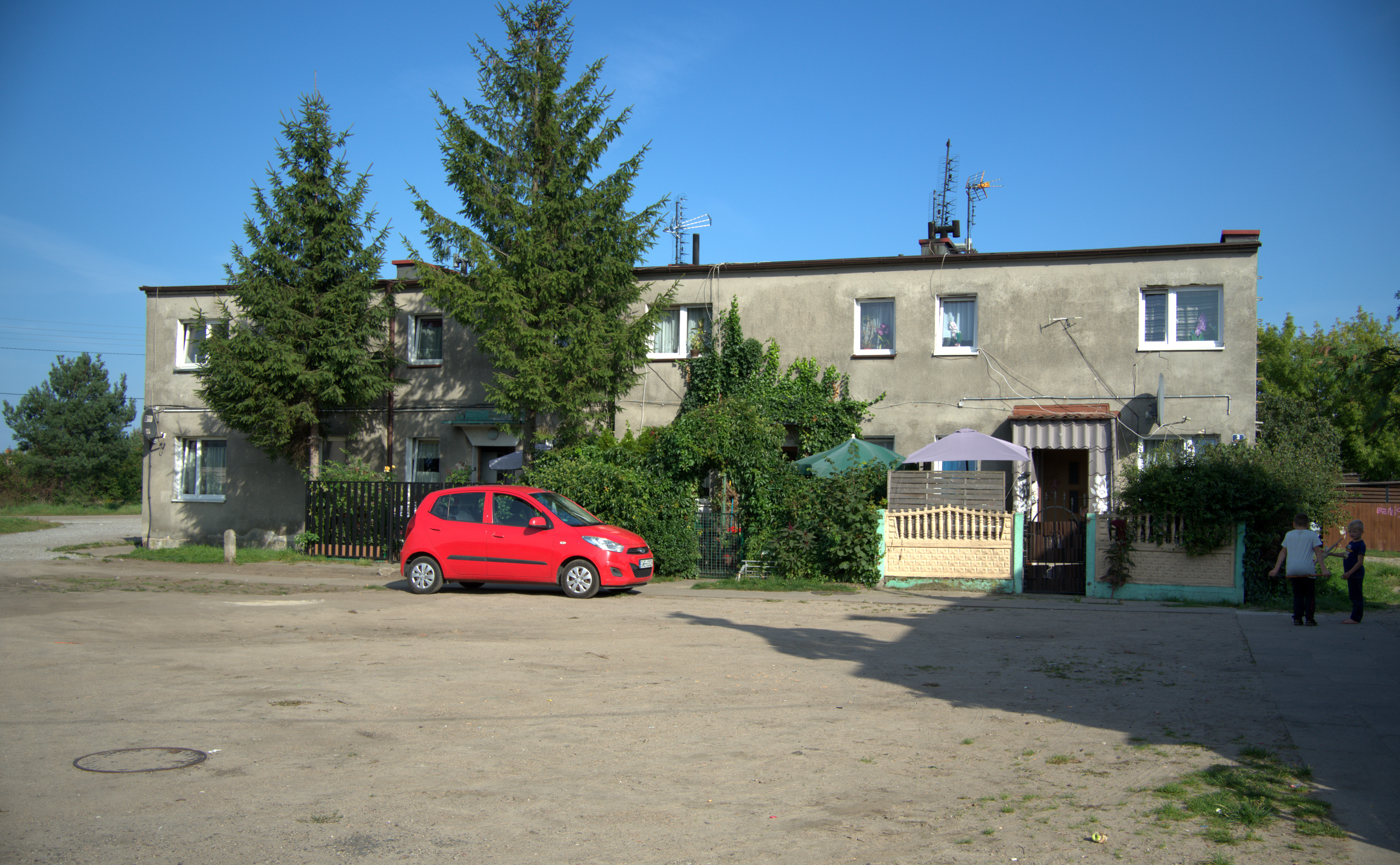
- Clockwise from top: skyline of Reda, housing in the Biała Rzeka area, and modernist architecture in Wejherowo
- Interactive map of Little Kashubian Tricity
- Country: Poland
- Voivodeship: Pomeranian
- Powiat: Wejherowo
- Region: Kashubia

Area
  - Total: 88 km^{2} (34 sq mi)

Population
  - Total: 129,735
  - Density: 1,500/km^{2} (3,800/sq mi)

Little Kashubian Tricity (Kashubian: Môłi Trzëgard; Polish: Małe Trójmiasto Kaszubskie) is a name used for an urban area in northern Poland comprising the three towns of Rumia, Reda and Wejherowo, located in Wejherowo County, Pomeranian Voivodeship, and within the ethnocultural region of Kashubia. The moniker is a reference to the bigger conurbation of Tricity, located adjacently, to the southeast, on the coast of the Baltic. Little Kashubian Tricity has a population of approximately 129,735 people, with a population of 53,000 in Rumia as of 2023, 48,735 in Wejherowo as of 2021, and approx. 28,000 in Reda as of 2021. Little Kashubian Tricity occupies an area of 88 km^{2}.

== See also ==
- Trivillage
