= Dziennik Bałtycki =

Regional daily newspaper in Poland

- Type: Daily newspaper
- Format: 350 x 289
- Editor-in-chief: Maciej Sandecki
- Launched: 19 May 1945; 81 years ago
- Language: Polish
- Headquarters: Gdańsk, Poland
- Website: dziennikbaltycki.pl

Dziennik Bałtycki (Polish pronunciation: [ˈd͡ʑɛn.ɲik bawˈtɘt͡s.ki], lit. 'Baltic Daily') is a regional daily newspaper which has been published in Gdańsk Pomerania since 1945. Government-owned prior to 1990, it is currently owned by Polska Press, in turn owned by the oil company Orlen.

== Publication ==
Dziennik Bałtycki is published six times per week, on each day except for Sunday. On Friday, 16 local affiliate newspapers and an addition with a television programme included are published as well. All issues can be accessed in the Baltic Digital Library in PDF and DjVu format.

== History ==
The first edition of Dziennik Bałtycki was published on 19 May 1945. Written and printed in Gdynia, it cost one złoty and had four pages. It was founded for the consumption of the growing Polish population of Pomerania, which was displacing the German population, and was a propaganda outlet for the Polish People's Republic for much of the communist era.

In 1951, the staff was moved to Gdańsk. Its main competitors prior to 1990 were Wieczór Wybrzeża and Głos Wybrzeża. In 1990, following the abolition of communism in the country, its previous publisher, RSW Prasa-Książka-Ruch, was liquidated amid mass privatization and bought by the French company Socpresse.

The magazine was then bought by Polska Press. Both of its main competitors were bought by the same company and incorporated into it in 2001 and 2002. In 2001, it began awarding the title of Dziennik Bałtycki Person of the Year. In December 2020, Orlen bought Polska Press, making it the new owner of Dziennik Bałtycki.
