= Wojciech Szczurek =

Polish politician

- Szczurek in 2011

Mayor of Gdynia
- In office 28 October 1998 – 7 May 2024
- Preceded by: Franciszka Cegielska
- Succeeded by: Aleksandra Kosiorek

Personal details
- Born: 1 December 1963 (age 62) Gdynia, Poland
- Party: Independent
- Spouse: Barbara Szczurek
- Profession: Lawyer (judge)

Wojciech Bogusław Szczurek (born 1 December 1963) is a Polish politician who served as the mayor of Gdynia from 1998 to 2024. He was also the advisor to the president of the Republic of Poland – Lech Kaczyński for local government.

== Biography ==
Wojciech Szczurek was born in Gdynia, Poland. He finished the Primary School no. 35 and later the Adam Mickiewicz Secondary School in Gdynia. He graduated from the Faculty of Law and Administration of the University of Gdansk, where he also received his doctoral degree.

In years 1989–1994 he worked as an assessor and later as a judge at the District Court in Gdynia. He used to adjudicate in the Civil Department.

In 1989 he co-founded the Civic Committee in Gdynia. Since 1990 he has been involved in local governmental activity. In years 1991–1998 he was the chairman of Gdynia City Council and, at the same time, the Gdynia City representative in the local government assembly of Gdansk Voivodeship. In the second half of the 1990s he joined 'Ruch Stu' ('The Movement of the 100'). Later on, he became leader of the new local political group called 'Samorządność' ('Self-government').

In 1998, appointed by the members of Gdynia City Council, he took office as Mayor of Gdynia. In the first direct mayoral election in 2002 he received 62.208 votes (77.26%) and thus won in the first round. In 2003 he took up a position of president of the Amber Road Cities Association – an organization supporting the construction of the A-1 Motorway. Since 16 March 2006 he was the local government advisor to the president of Poland Lech Kaczyński.

In the election of 2006 he won in the first round again, receiving 82.438 votes (85.81%) and defeating, among others, Law and Justice (Prawo i Sprawiedliwość) party's candidate – MP Zbigniew Kozak (7.49%). In 2010 Wojciech Szczurek was re-elected for his fourth term, receiving 80.345 votes (87.39%).

He's a member of the Senate of the Academy of International Economic and Political Relations and of the Programme Council of the Gdansk Institute for Market Economics' Centre for Baltic Studies.

He is the author of Działalność gospodarcza gmin w portach morskich (Business Activity of Municipalities in Maritime Ports), Gdansk 2000, ISBN 83-88829-38-6 and a co-author of Prawo w portach morskich (Law in Maritime Ports), Warsaw 1998, ISBN 978-83-87286-86-6.

Awards and distinctions

State awards

• Officer's Cross of the Order of Polonia Restituta (2009)

• The Medal for Merit to Culture – Gloria Artis awarded by Minister of Culture and National Heritage of the Republic of Poland (2005)

• Merit for Tourism Medal awarded by Minister of Sport and Tourism

Distinctions

• The Pro Ecclesia et Pontifice Gold Cross

• 'European of the year 2010' title in the category: 'Host of municipality, city or region" awarded by the Monitor Unii Europejskiej monthly

• 'Franciszka Cegielska’s Rose' for the merit to development of self-government in Poland (2010

• 'Vector 2006' statuette awarded by the Polish Employers' Confederation in 2007

• 'Men of the Year 2002' title awarded by the Dziennik Bałtycki daily

• 'Radio Personality of the Year' awarded by Radio Gdansk

• The Andrzej Bączkowski’s Award for year 2010

• 'Races of the Year 2003' for the organization of Cutty Sark Tall Ships Races – awarded by the Polish Yachting Organisation in 2004

• Special statuette of the "All of Poland reads to Kids" campaign awarded by a foundation promoting reading to children (2008)

Personal life

He’s married to Barbara, they have three sons – Mateusz, Marek and Maciej.
